= List of bridges in Venice =

The historic center of Venice is made up of 121 islands linked by 435 bridges. This list shows the venetian names of the main bridges of Venice by sestiere (district) or island.

== Bridges to the city ==
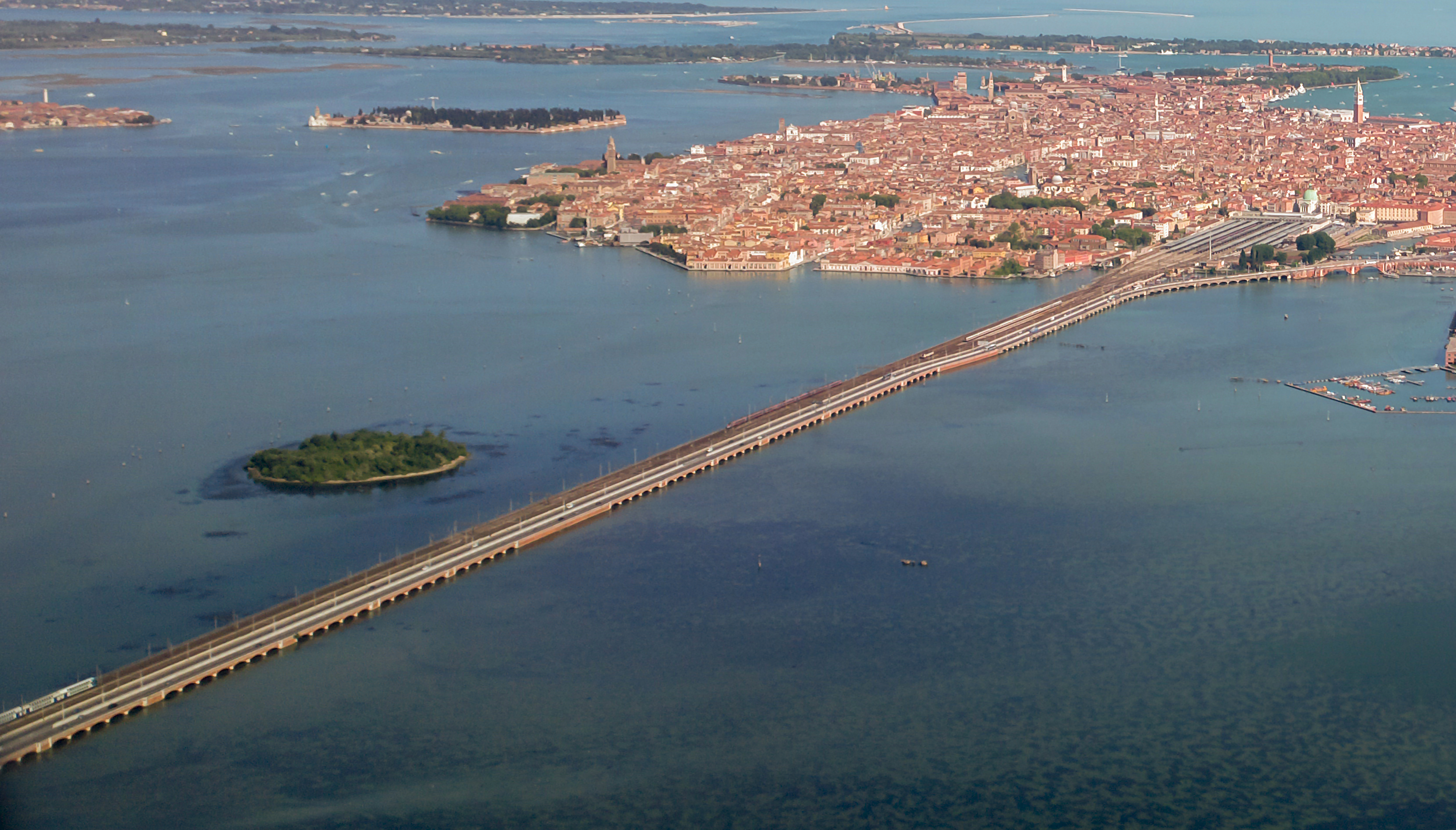
Ponte della Libertà

== Bridges over the Canal Grande ==
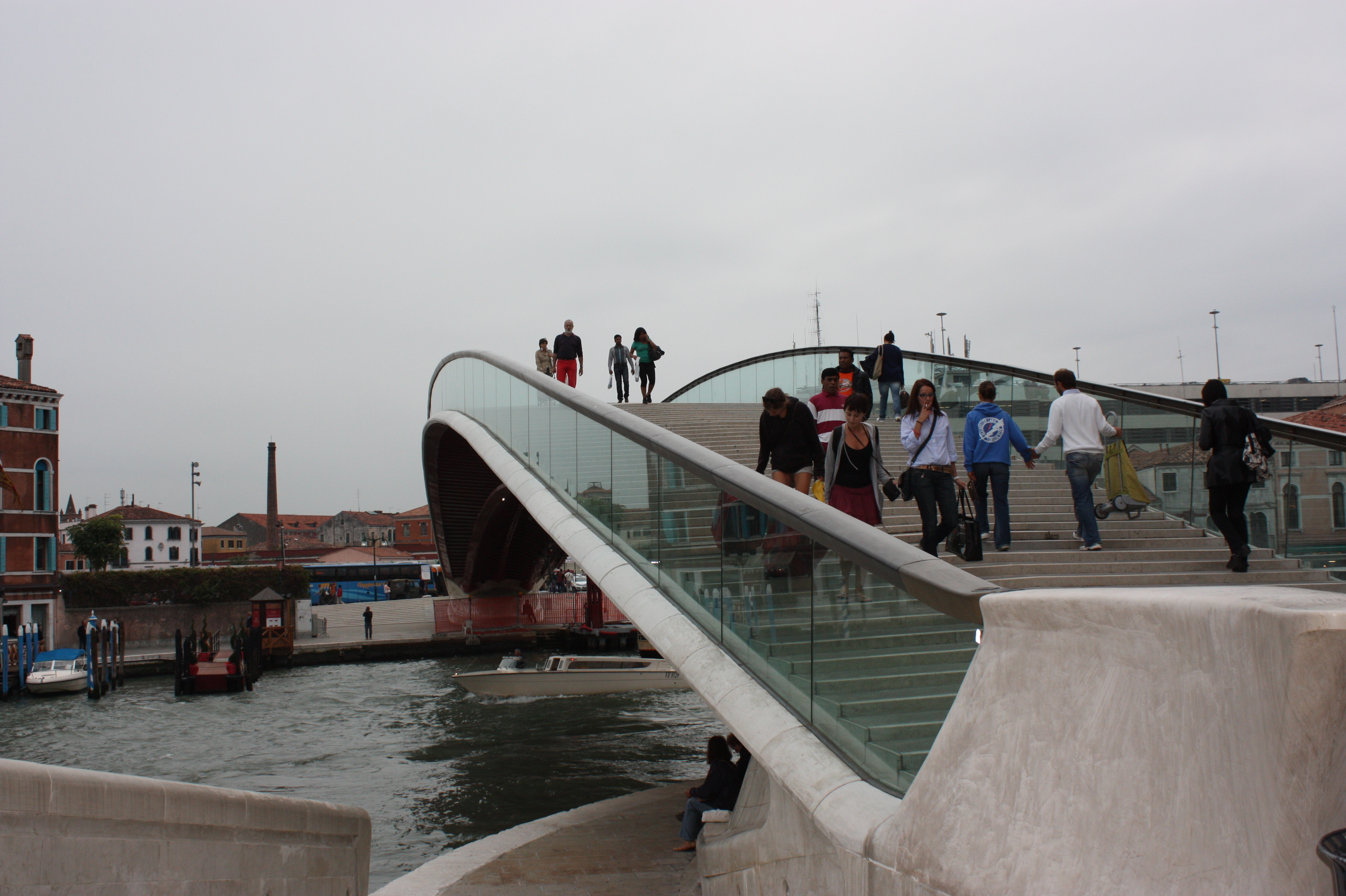
Ponte della Costituzione o di Calatrava

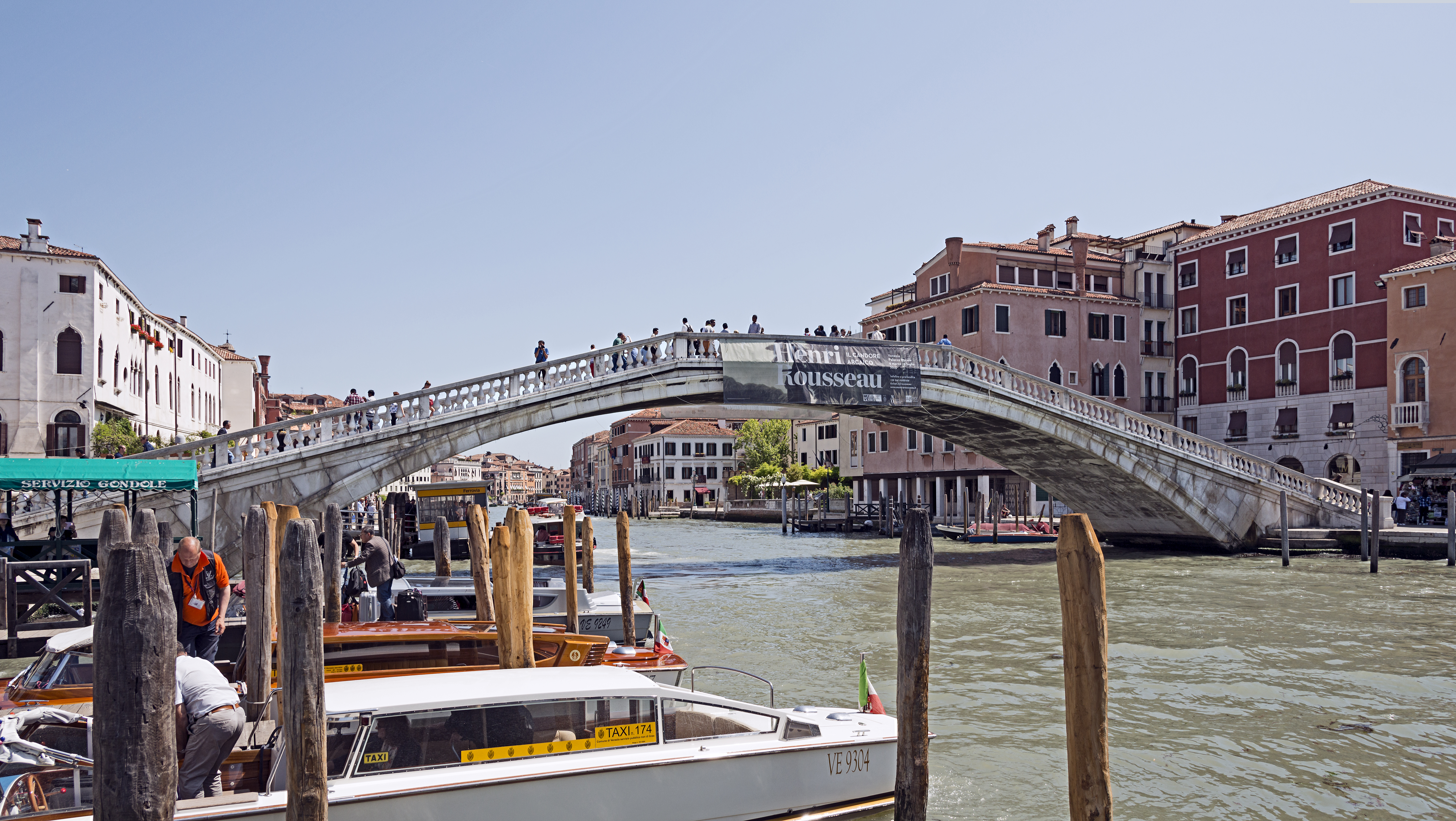
Ponte degli Scalzi

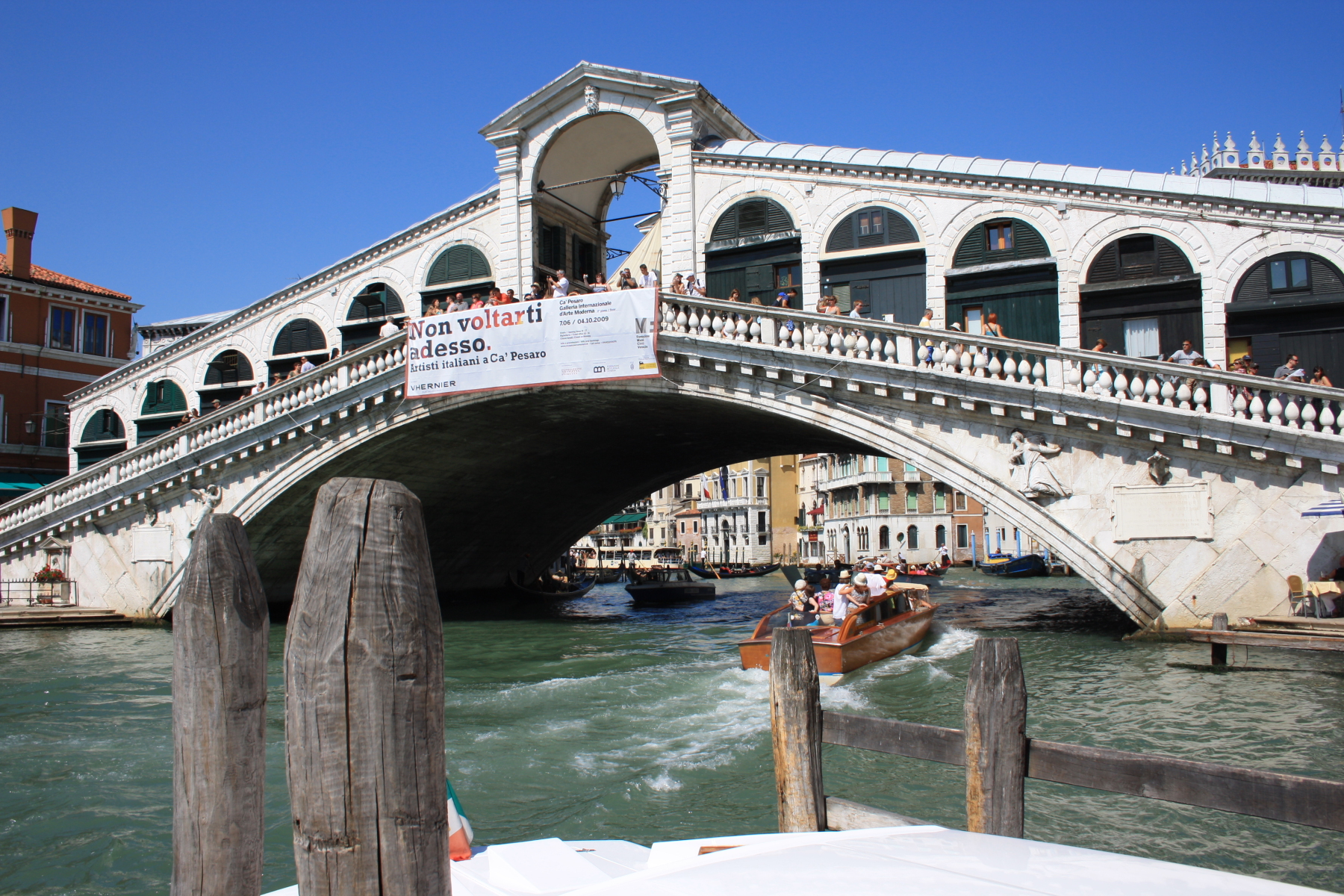
Ponte di Rialto

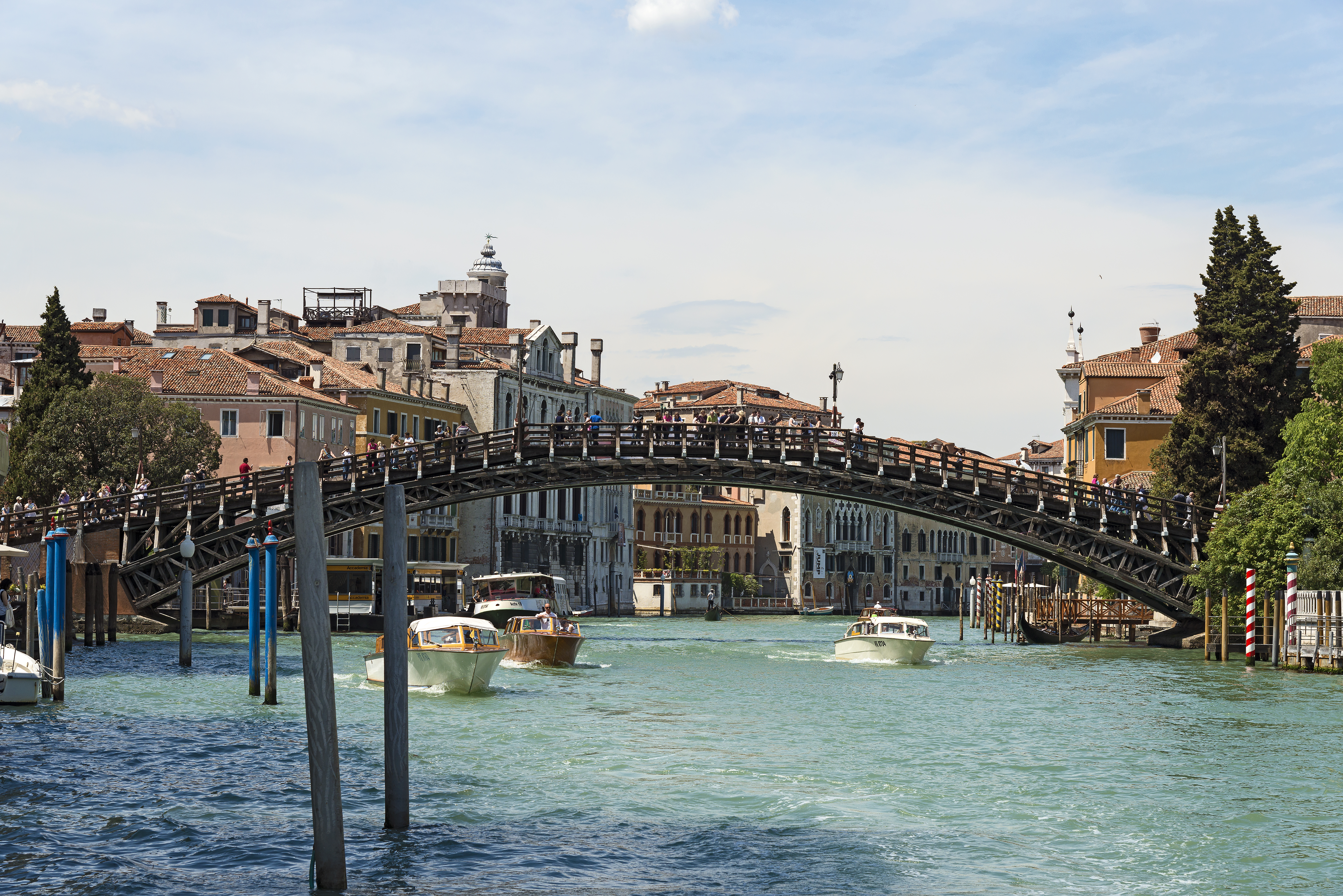
Ponte dell'Accademia

== Sestieri of Cannaregio ==
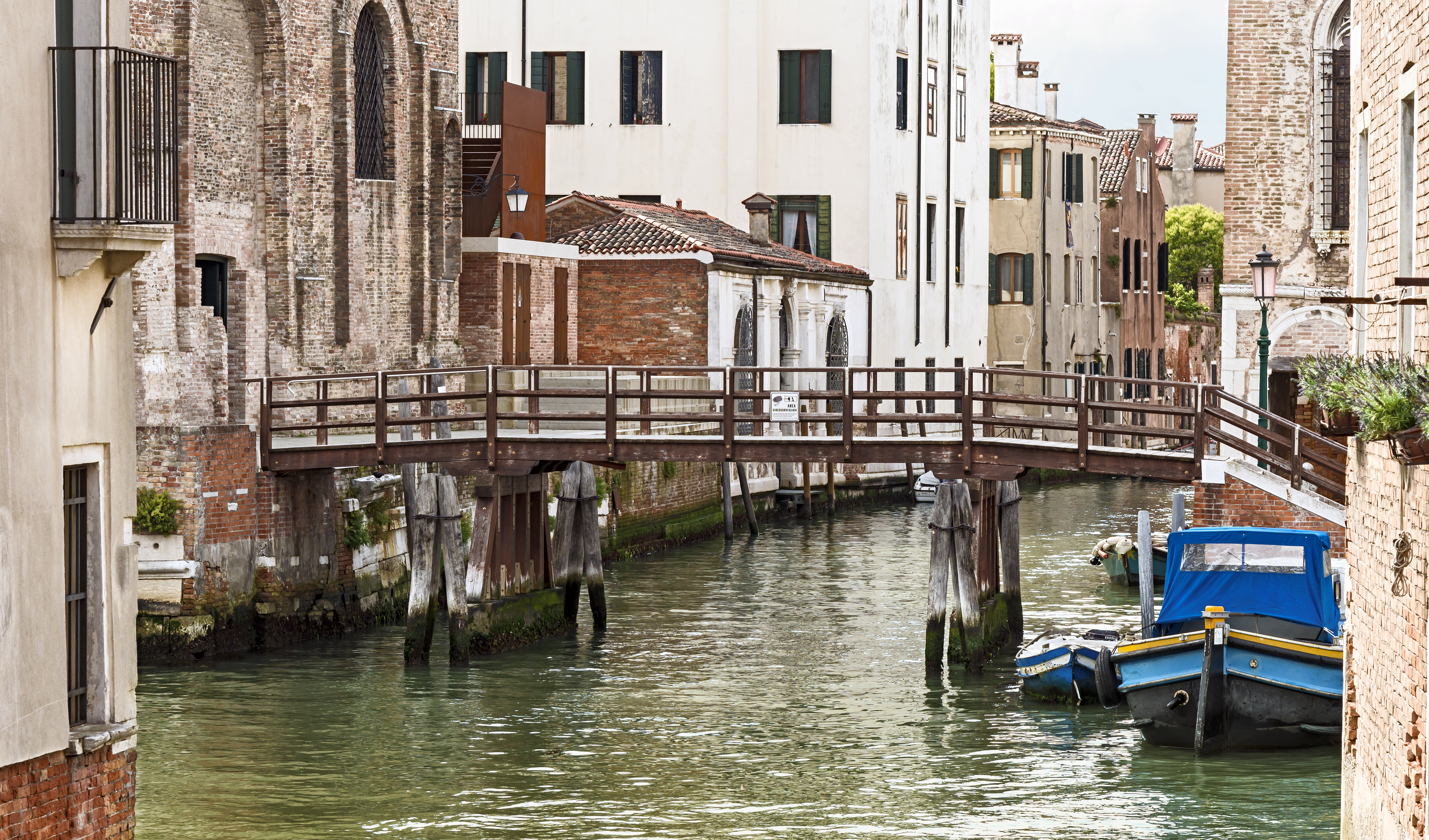
Ponte de l'Abazia
Rio de la Sensa

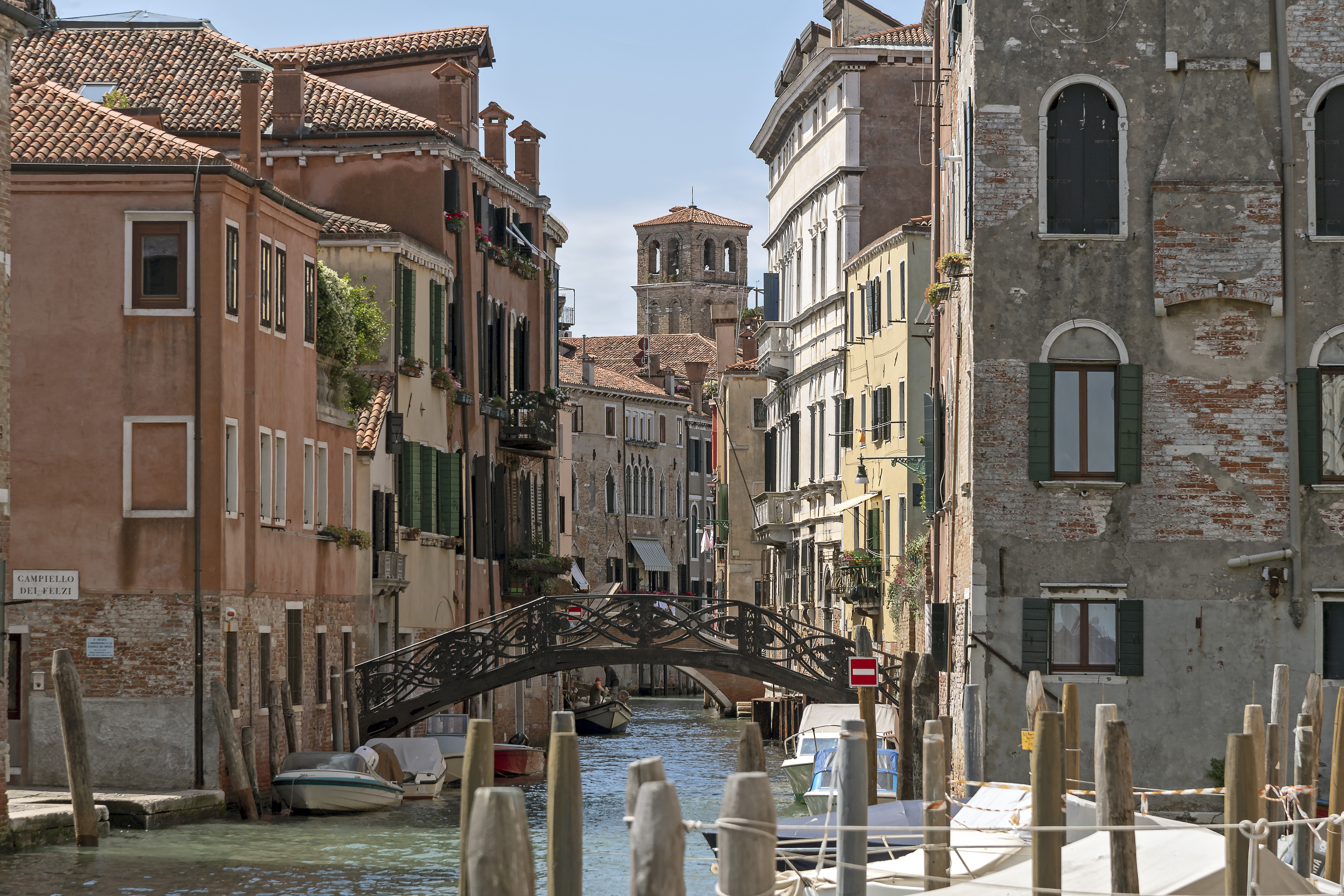
Ponte de l'Acquavita
Rio dei Gesuiti

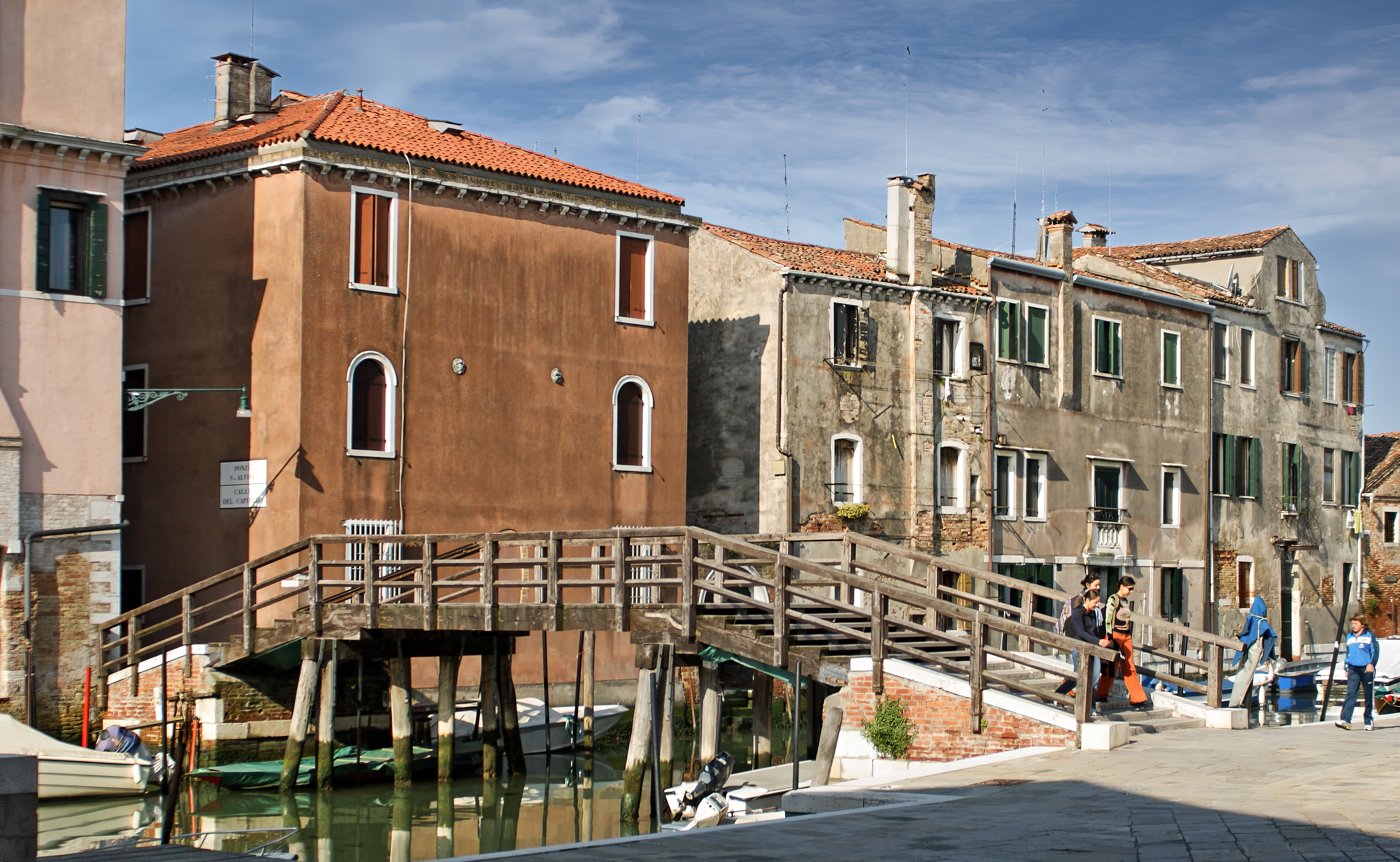
Ponte Sant'Alvise
Rio de Sant'Alvise

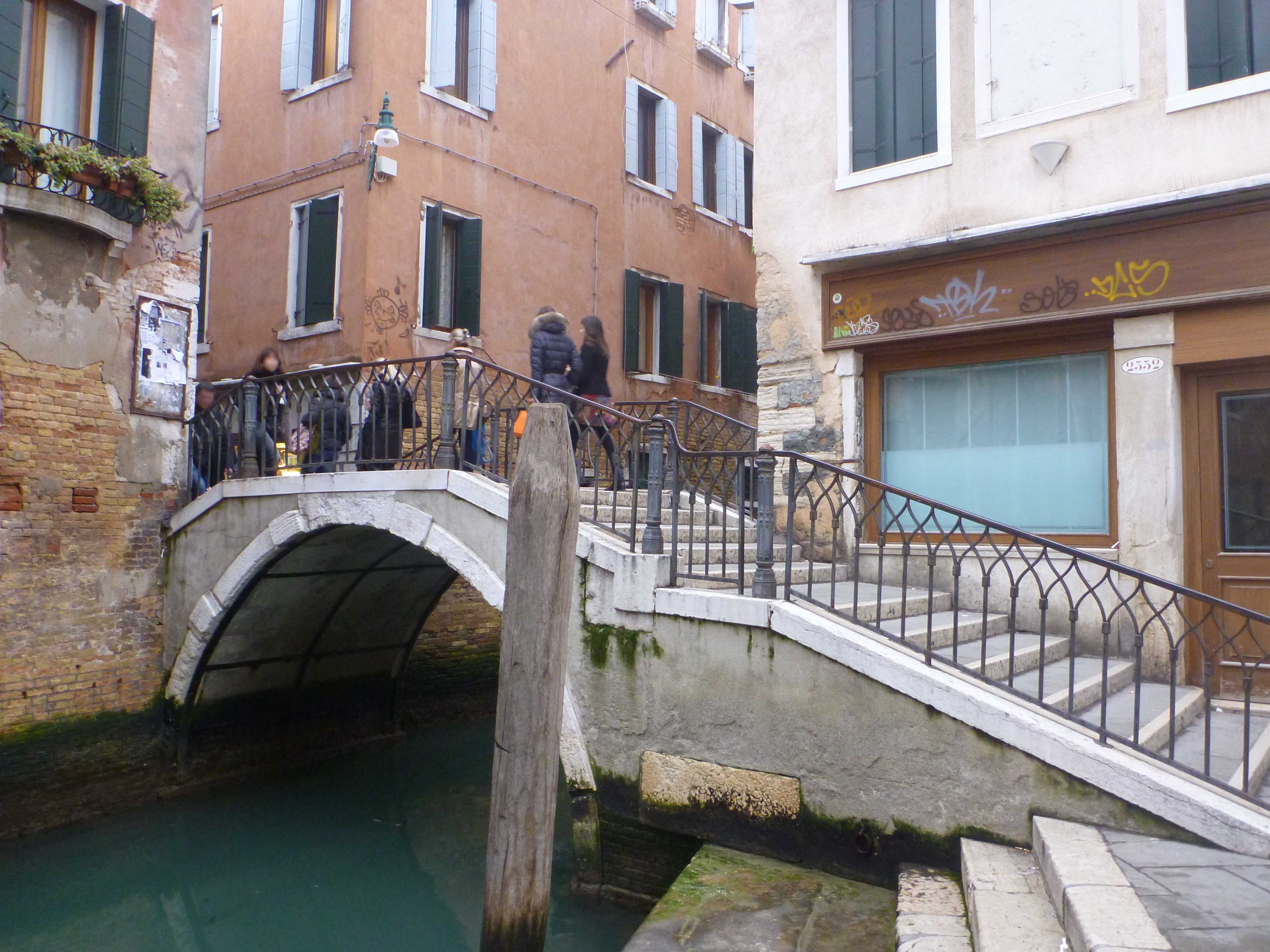
Ponte de l'Anconeta
Rio de San Marcuola

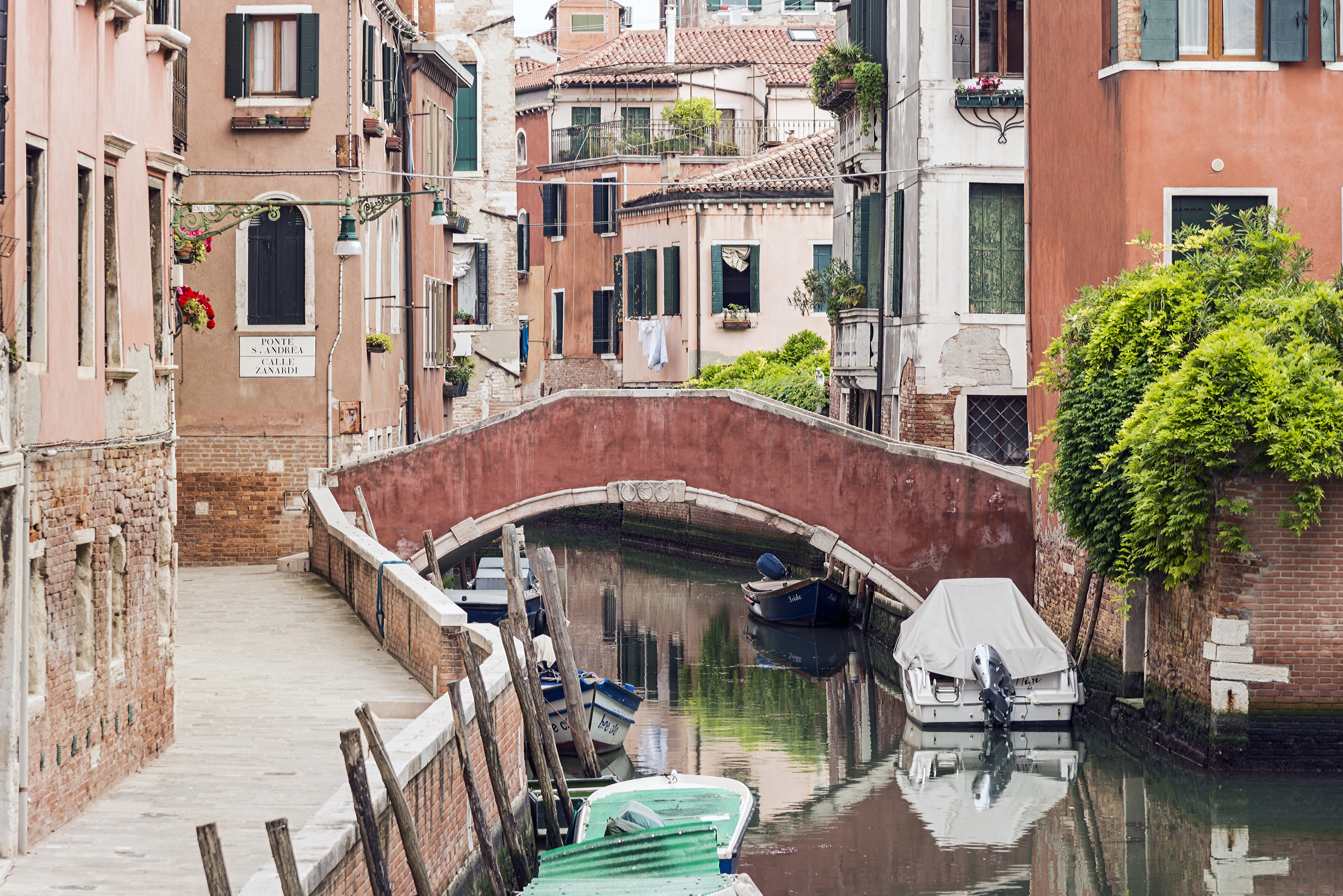
Ponte Sant'Andrea
Rio de Sant'Andrea

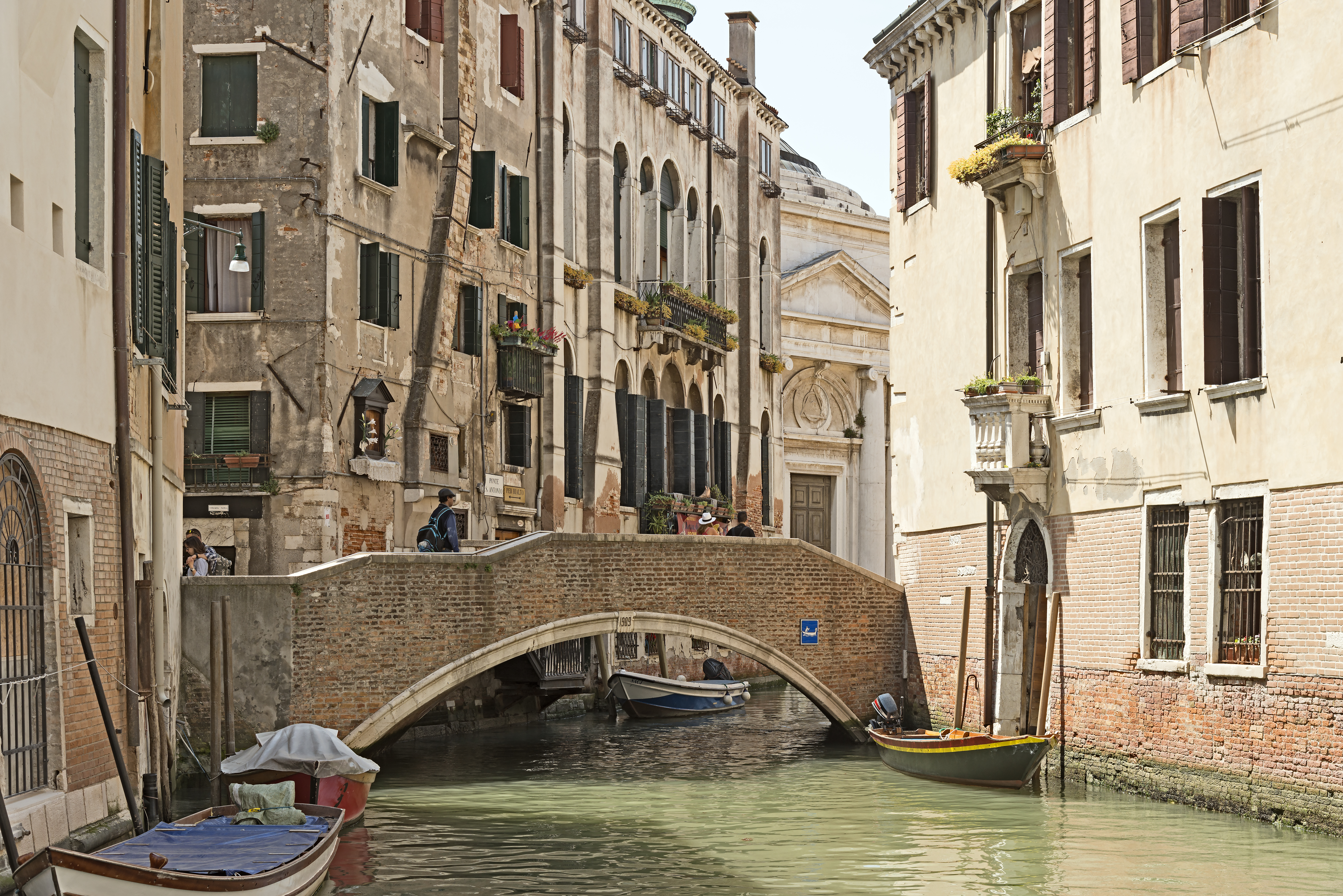
Ponte Sant Antonio
Rio de la Madalena

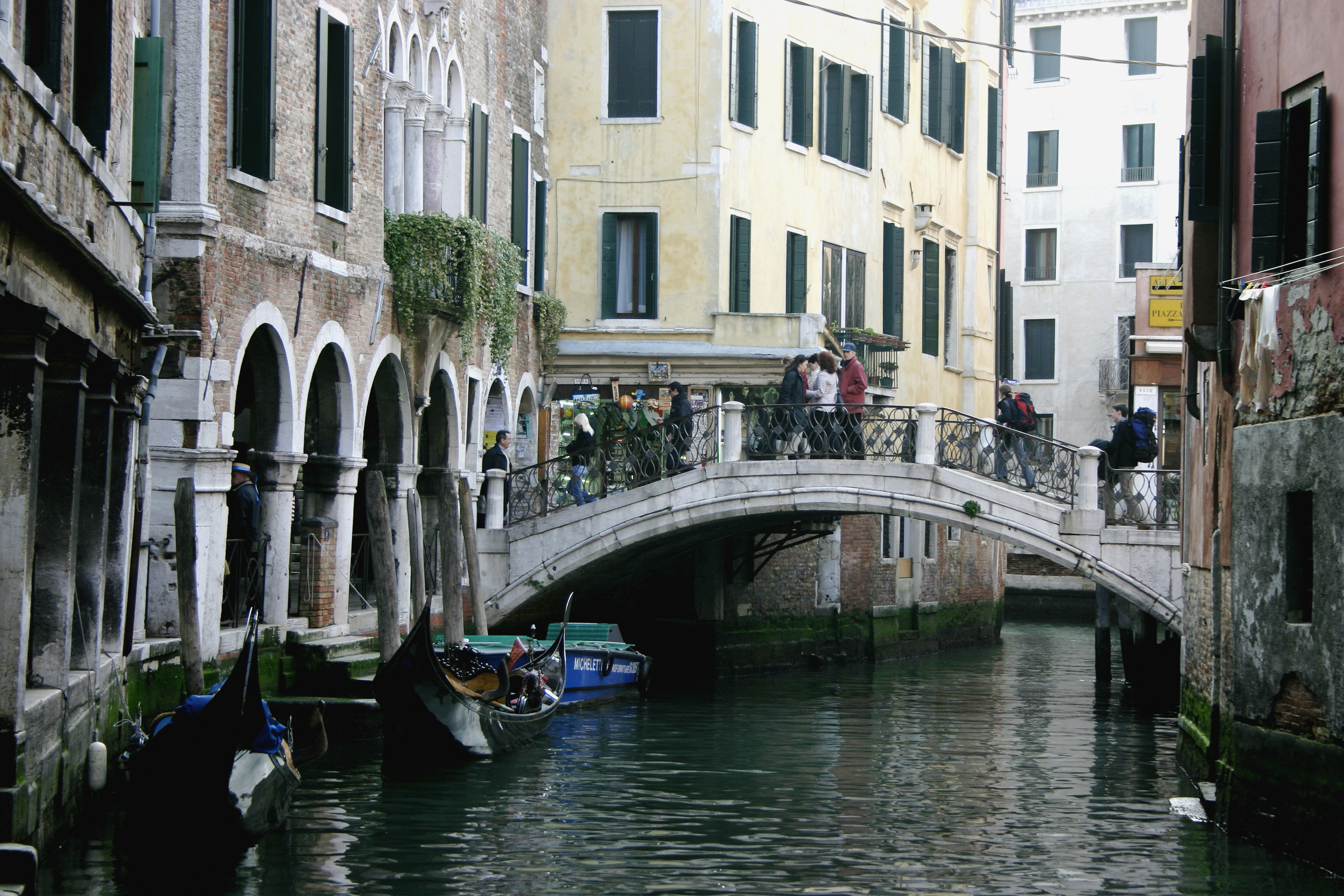
Ponte Santi Apostoli
Rio dei Santi Apostoli

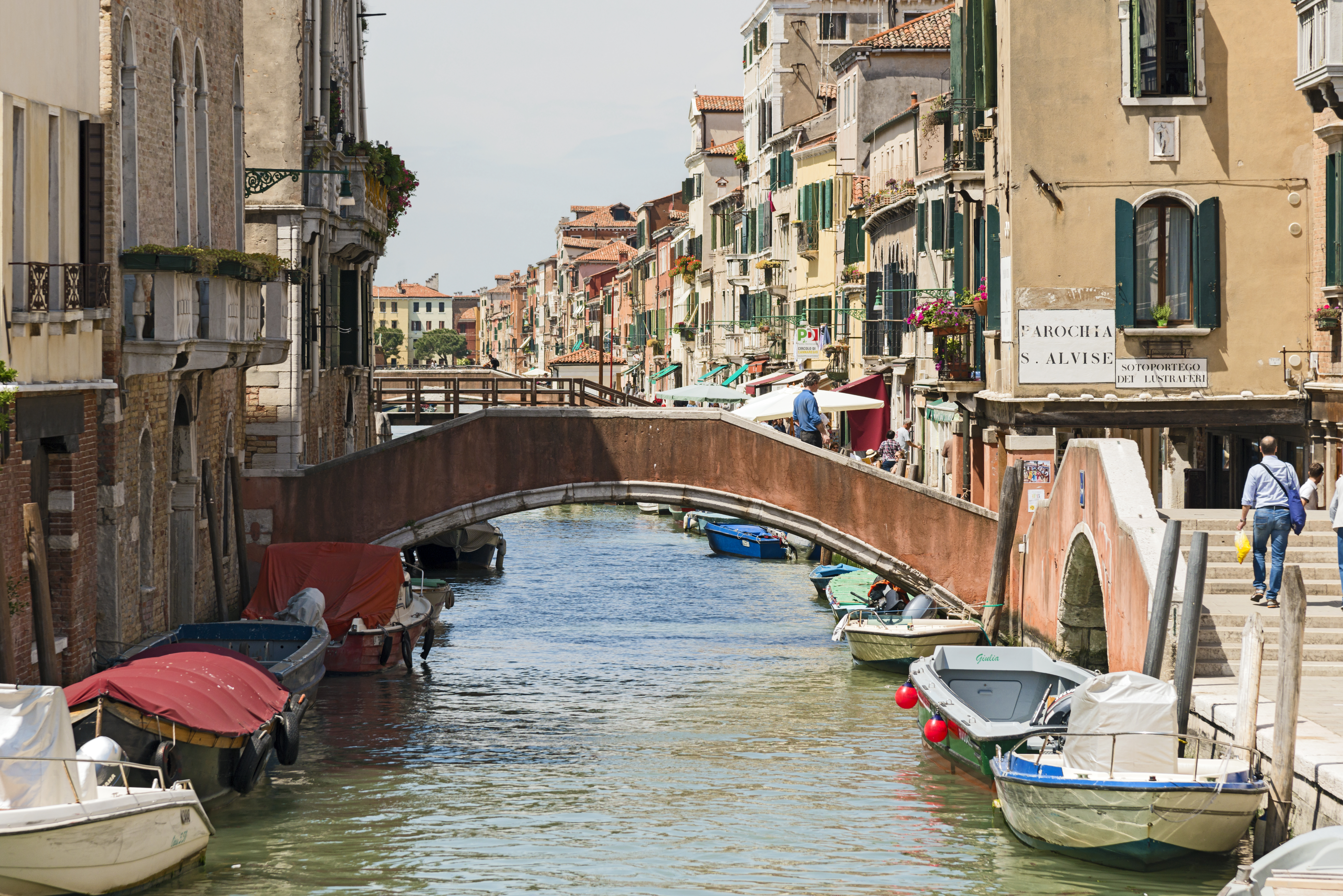
Ponte de l'Aseo
Rio de San Girolamo

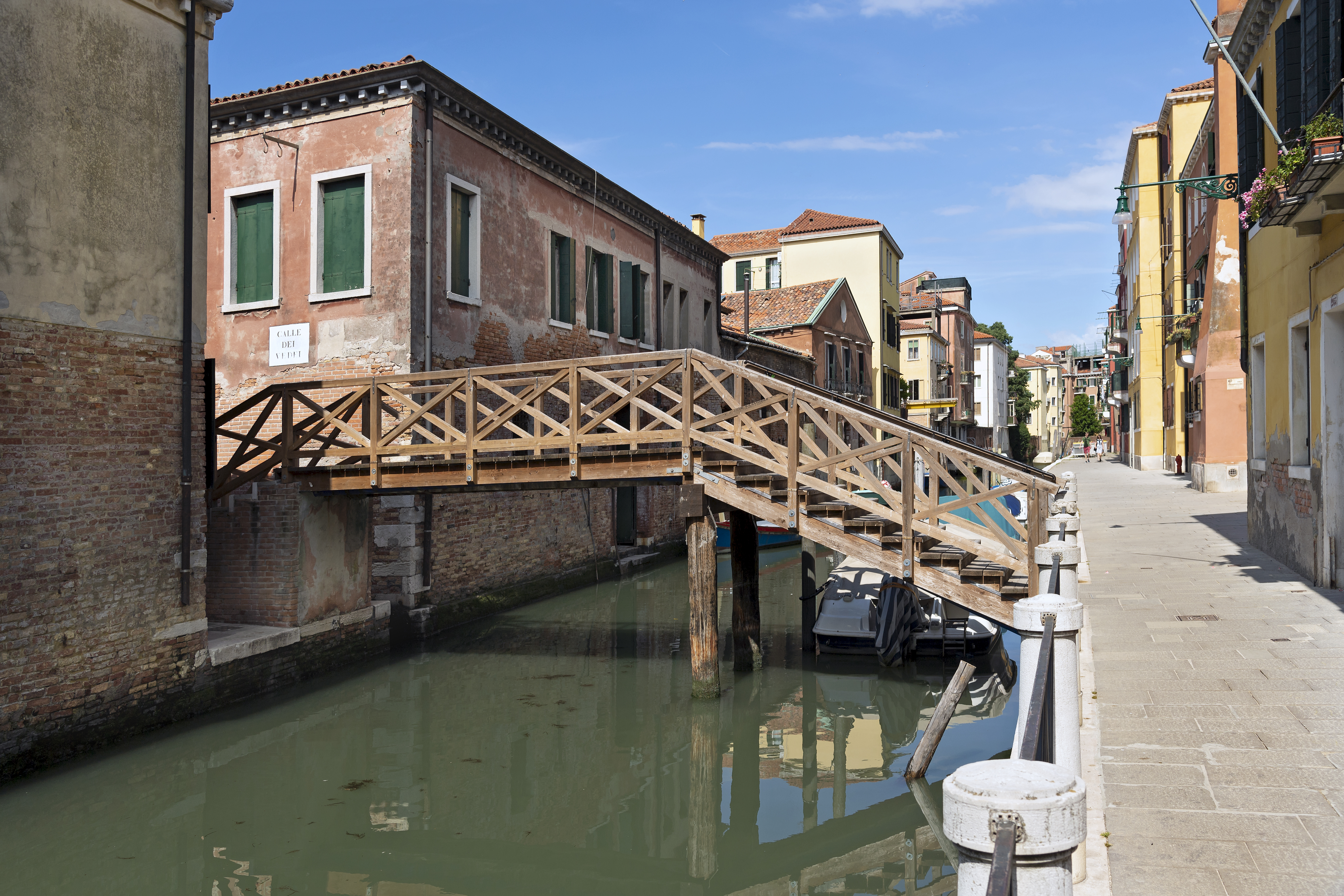
Ponte del Batelo
Rio del Battello

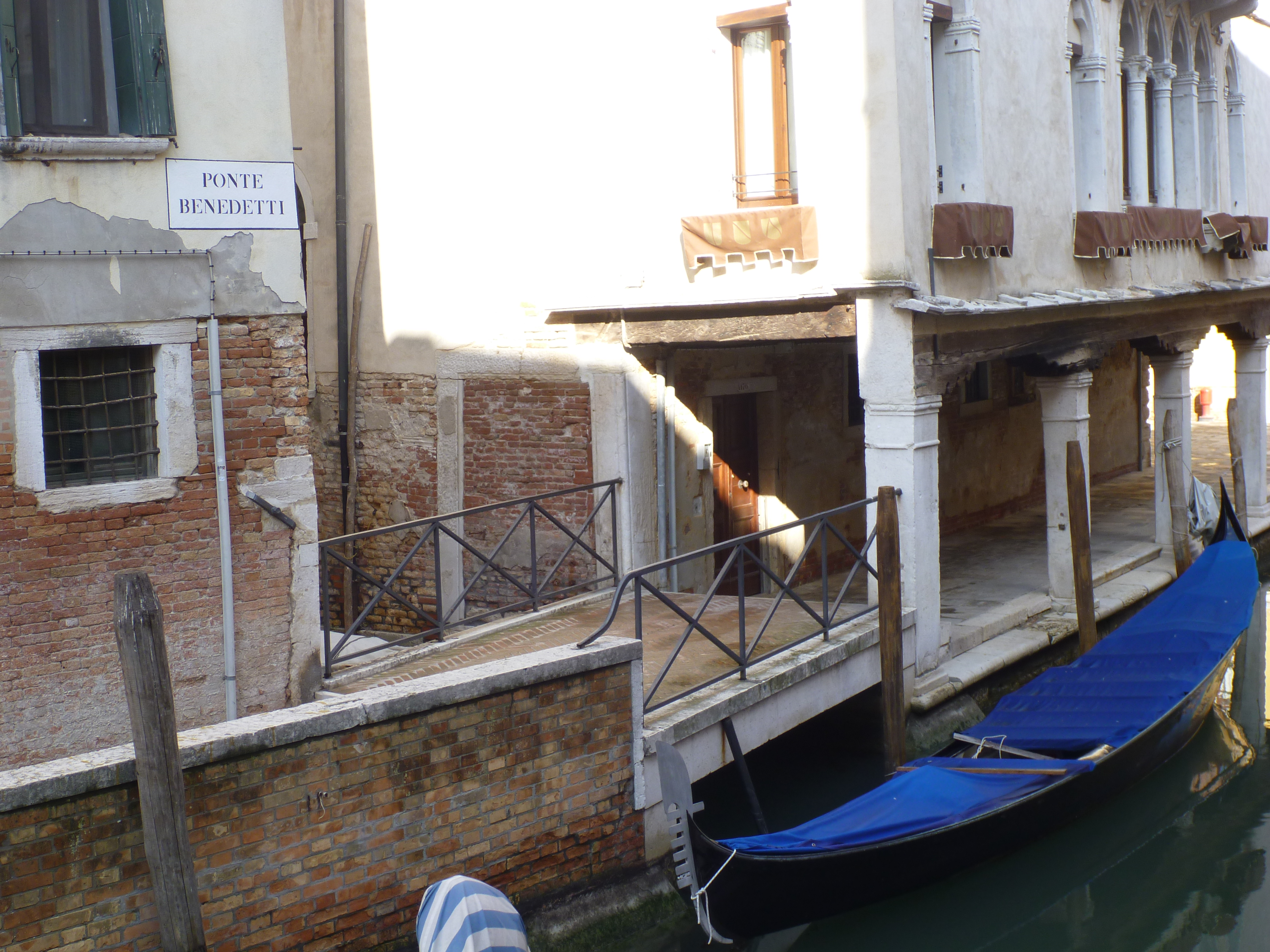
Ponte Benedetti
Riello de Santa Sofia

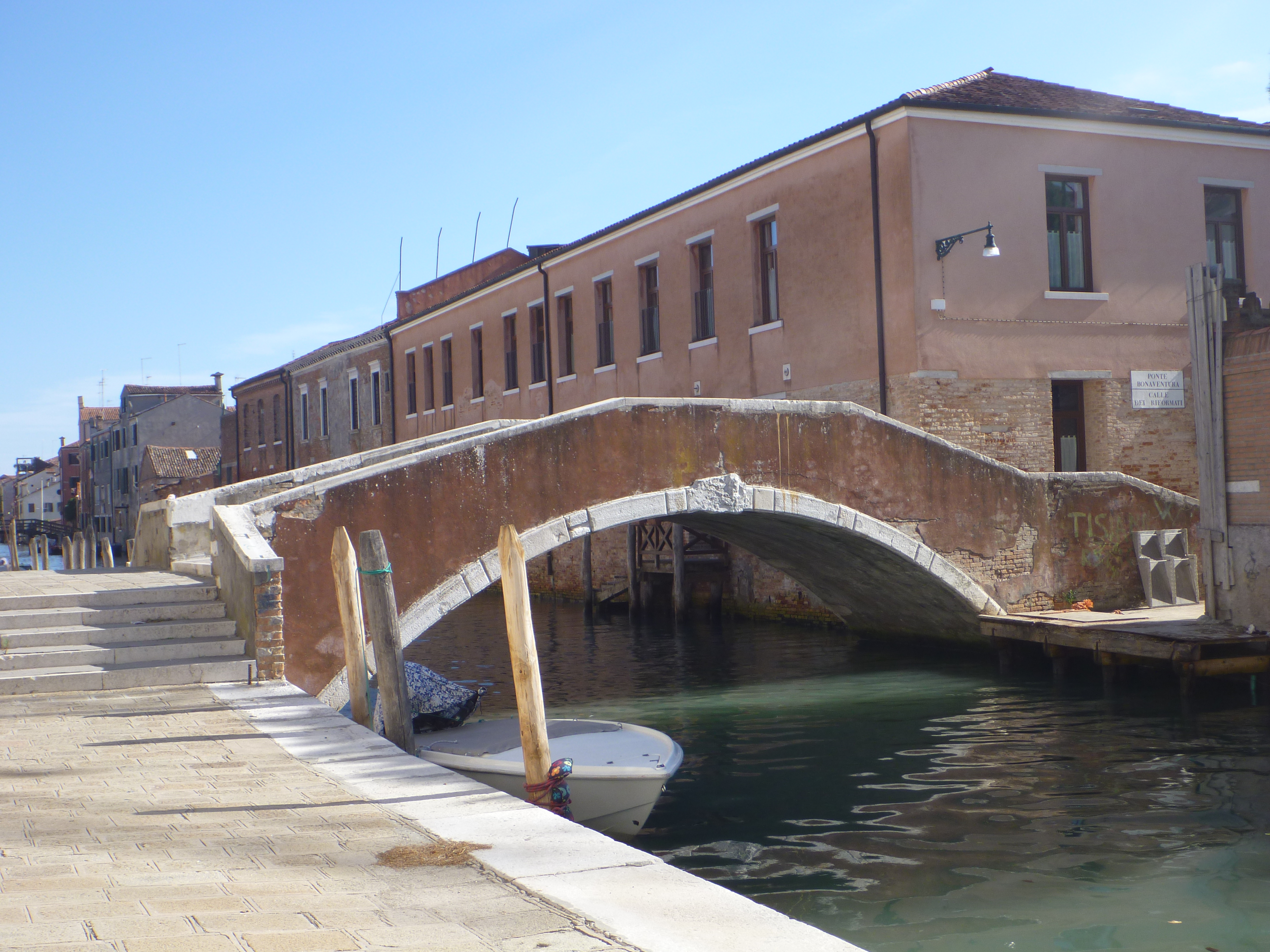
Ponte Sant'Bonaventura
Rio de Sant'Alvise

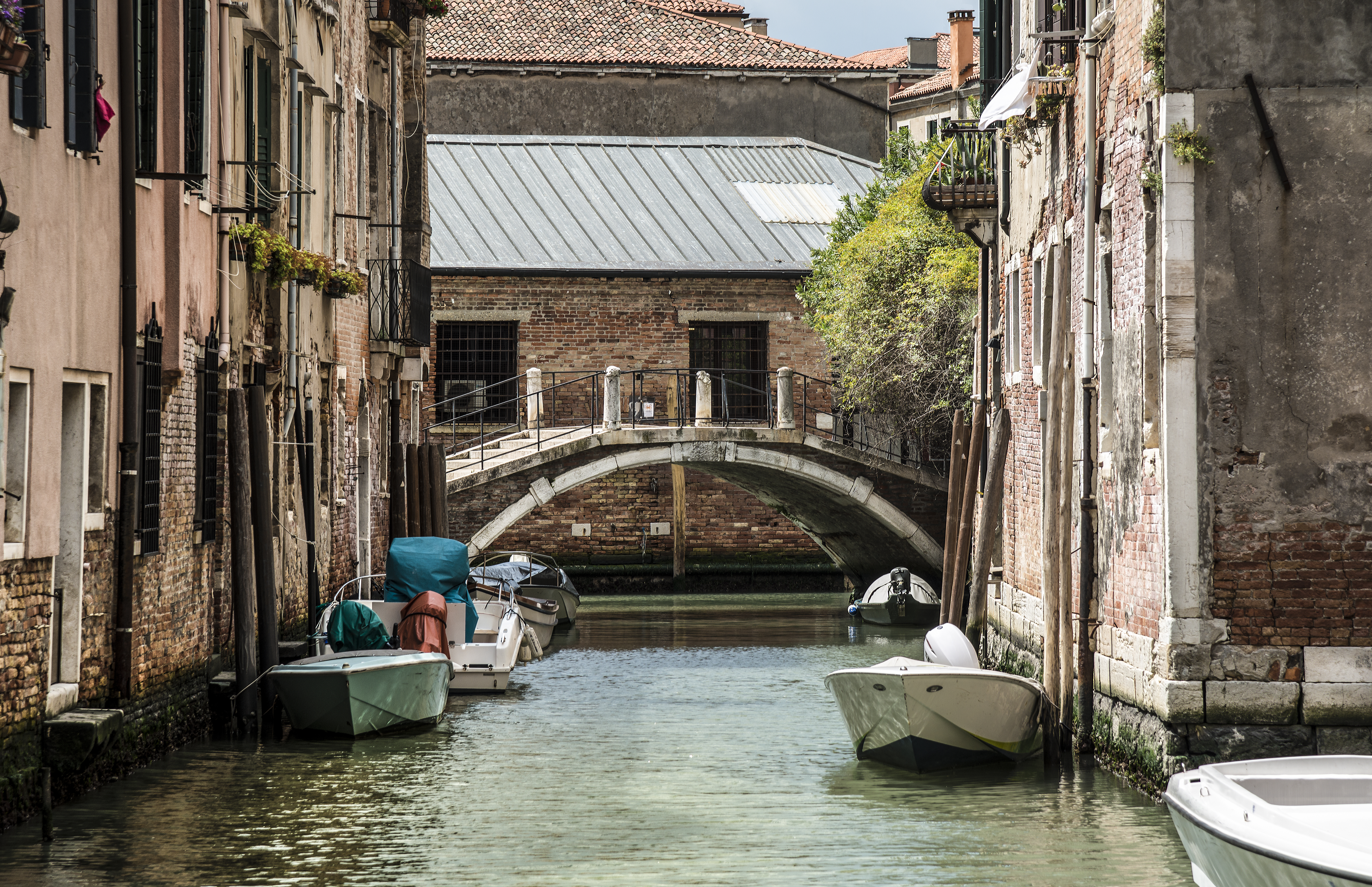
Ponte Brazzo
Rio Brazzo

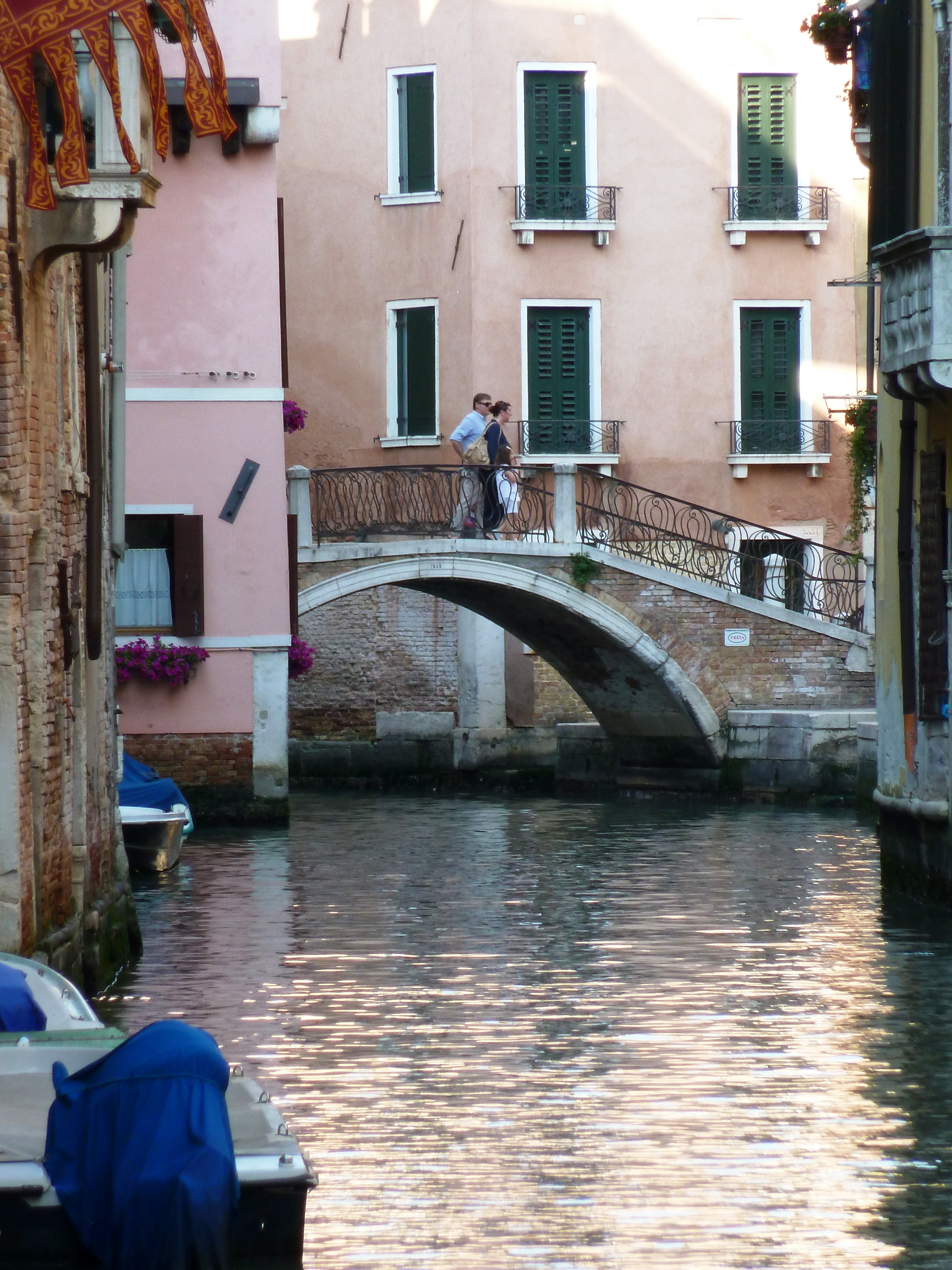
Ponte San Canzian
Rio dei Santi Apostoli

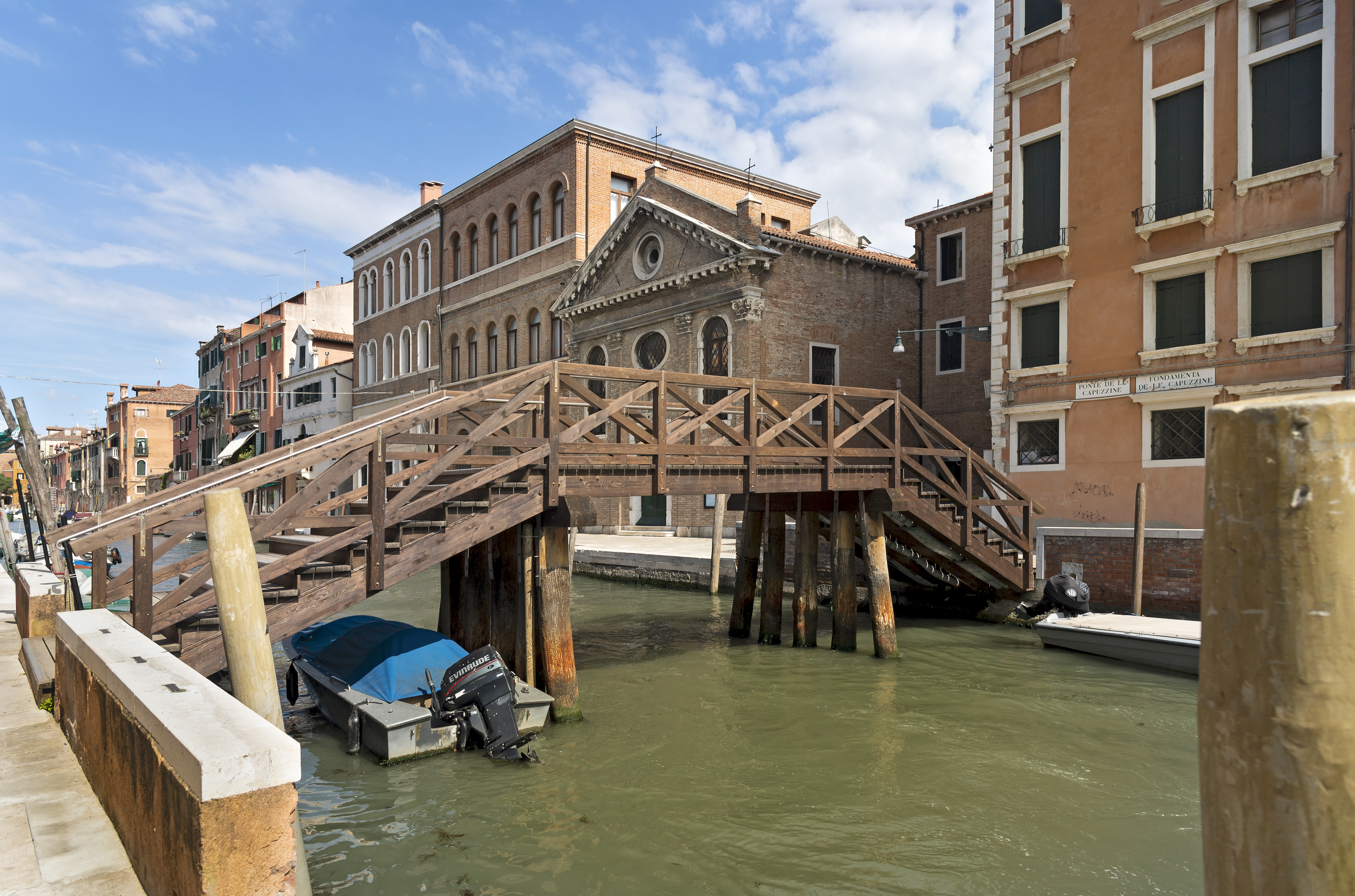
Ponte de le Capuzzine
Rio de San Girolamo

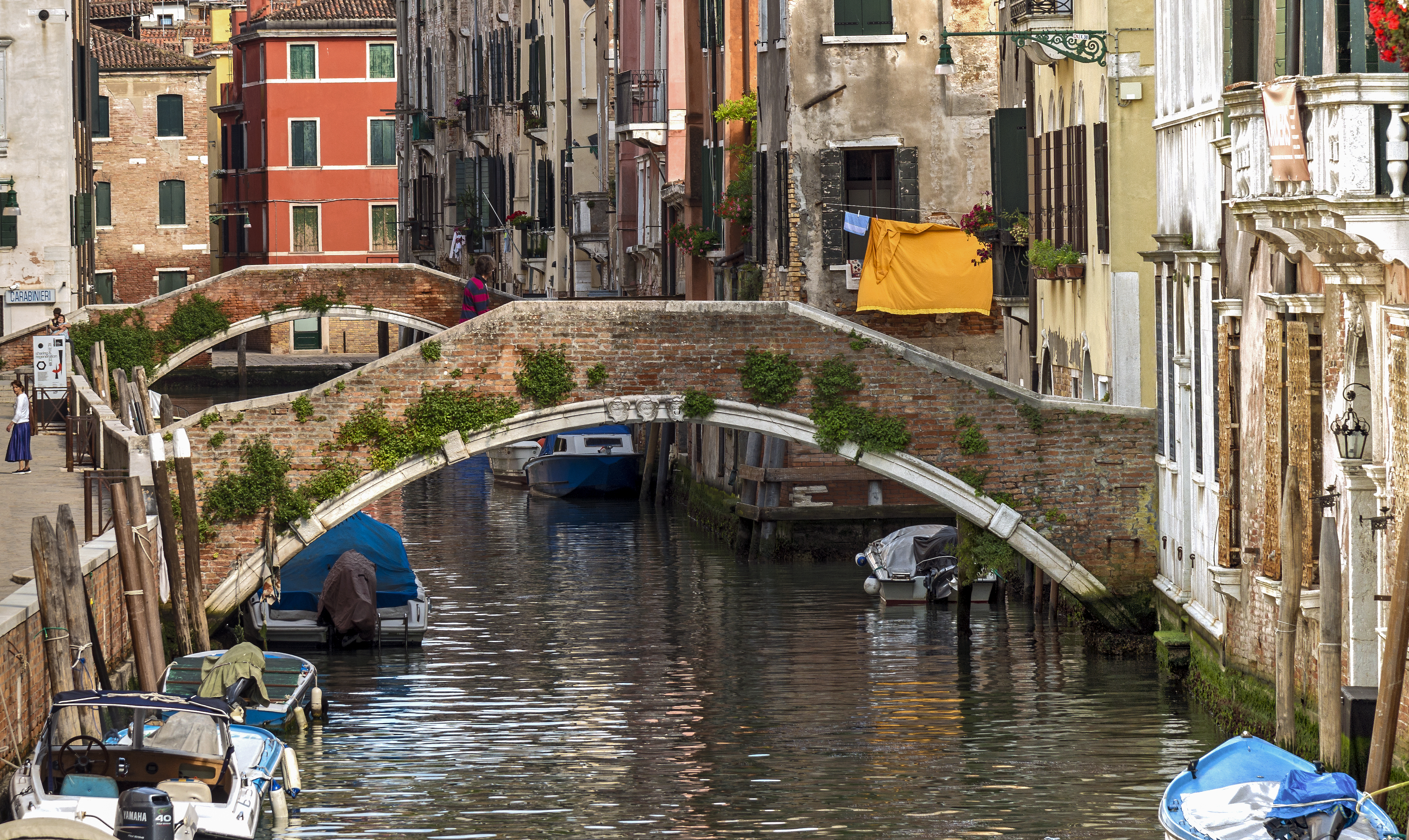
Ponte Santa Caterina/Zanardi
Rio de Santa Caterina

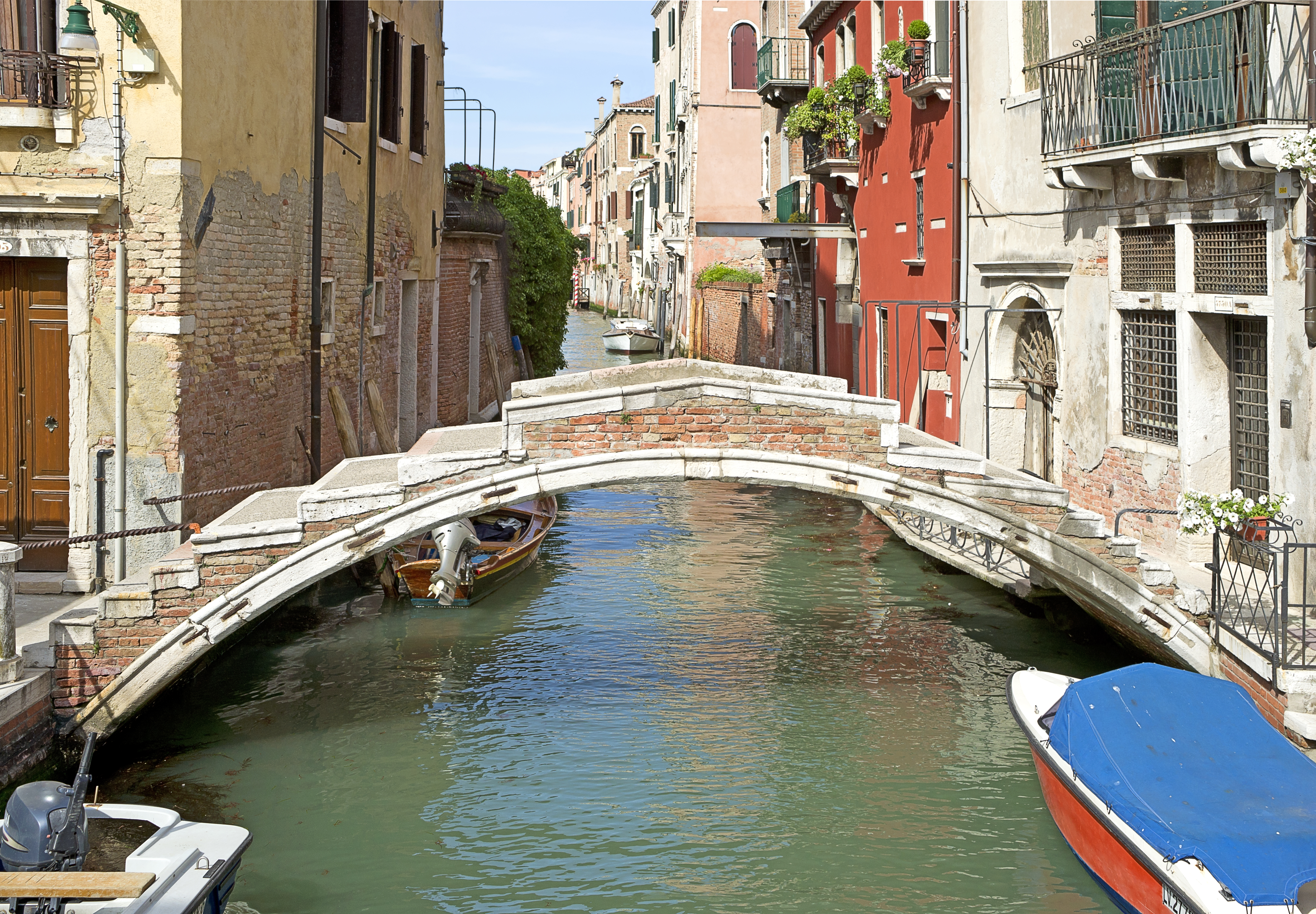
Ponte Chiodo
Rio de San Felice

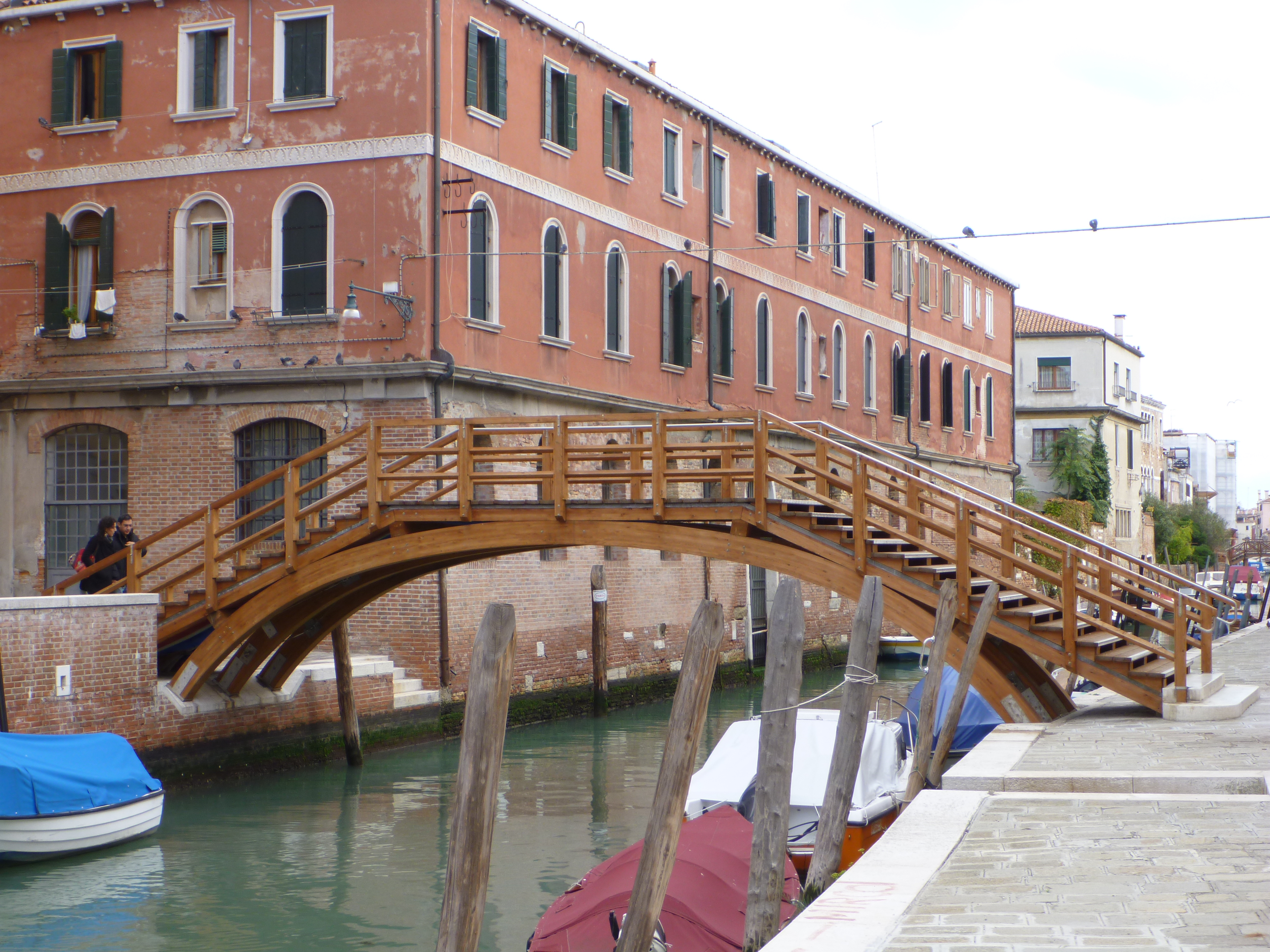
Ponte Contarini
Rio de la Sensa

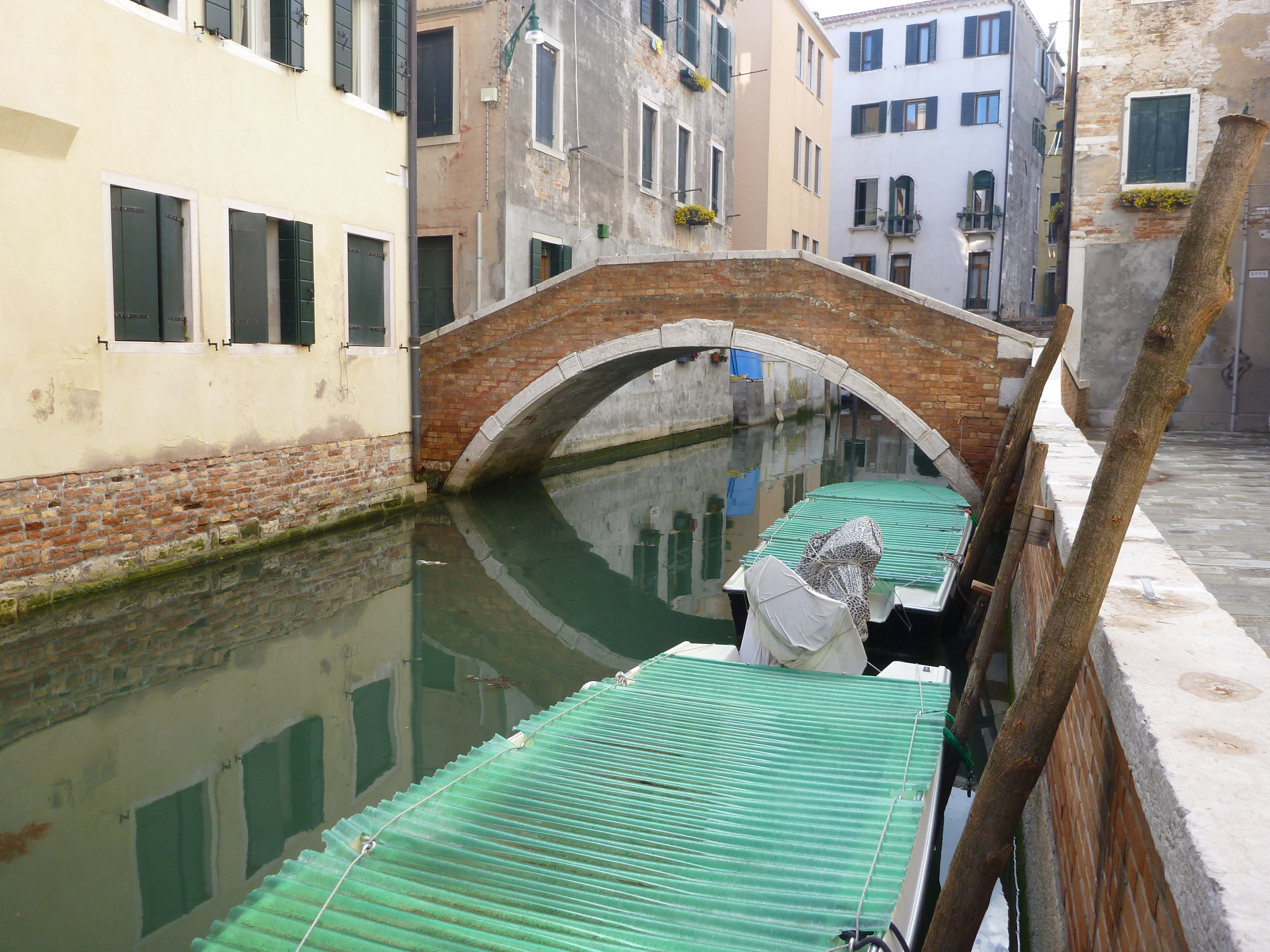
Ponte Corrente
Rio de Sant'Andrea (Gozzi-Sartori)

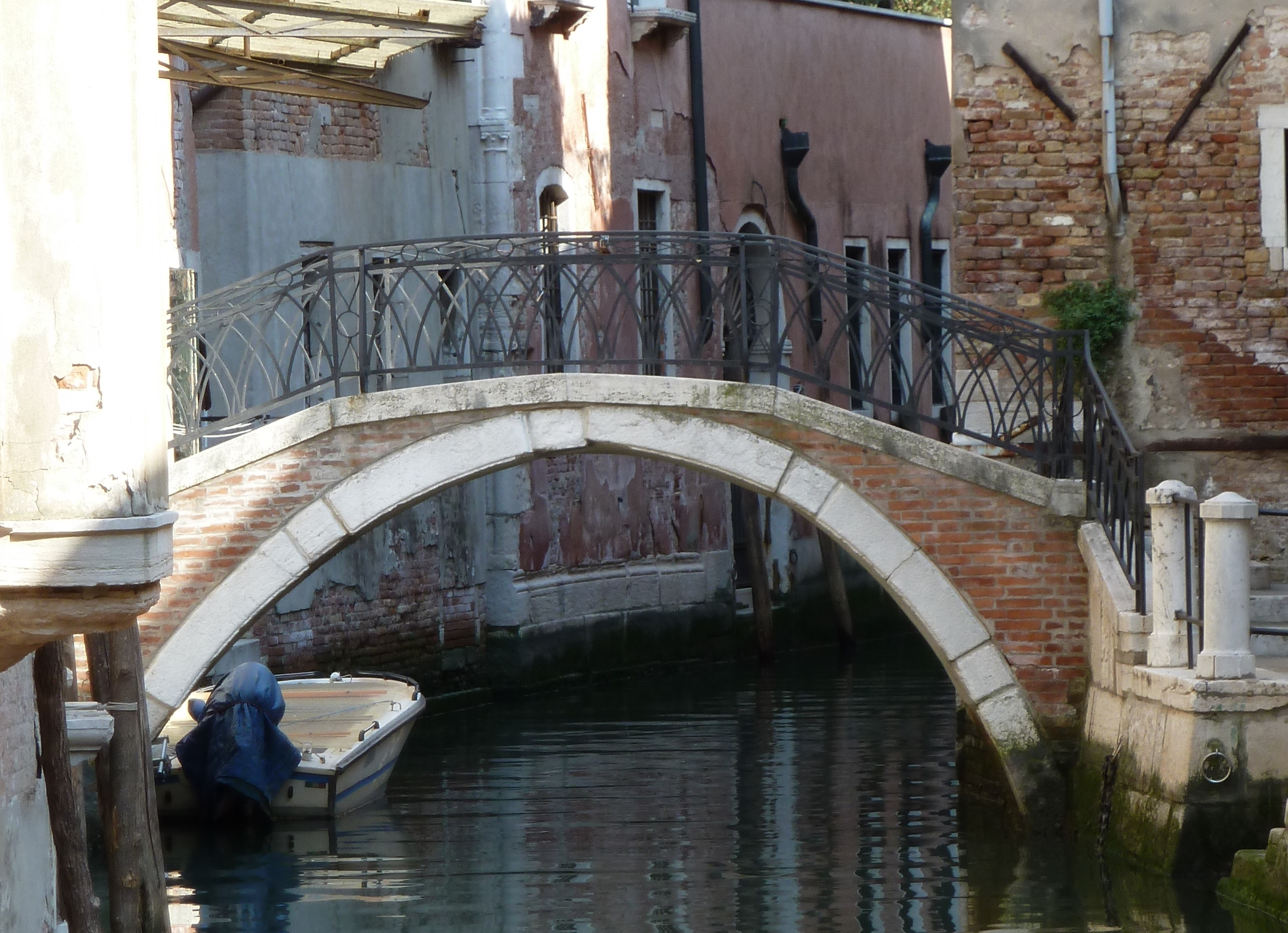
Ponte Correr
Rio de la Madalena

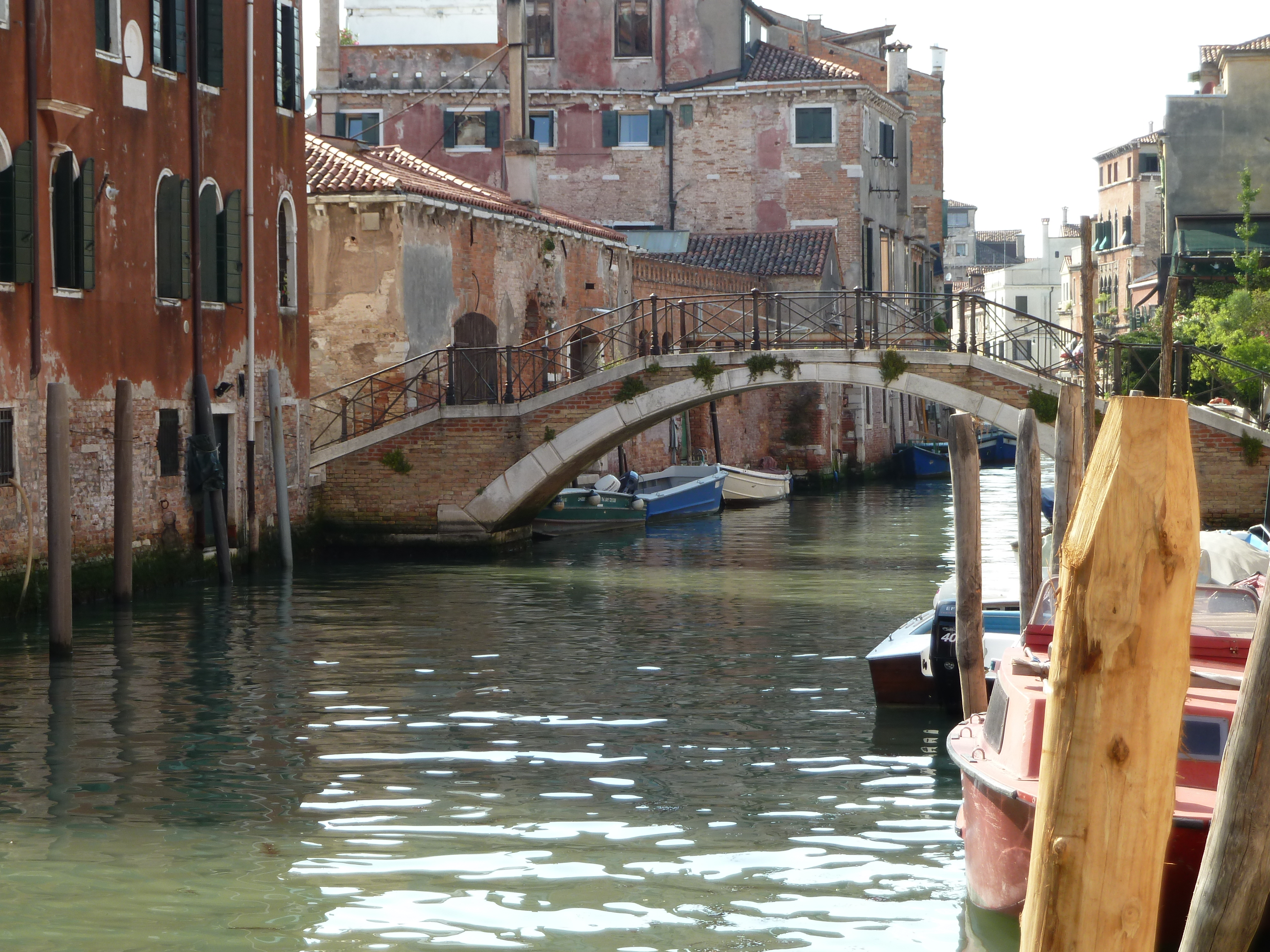
Ponte Corte Vecia
Rio de la Sensa

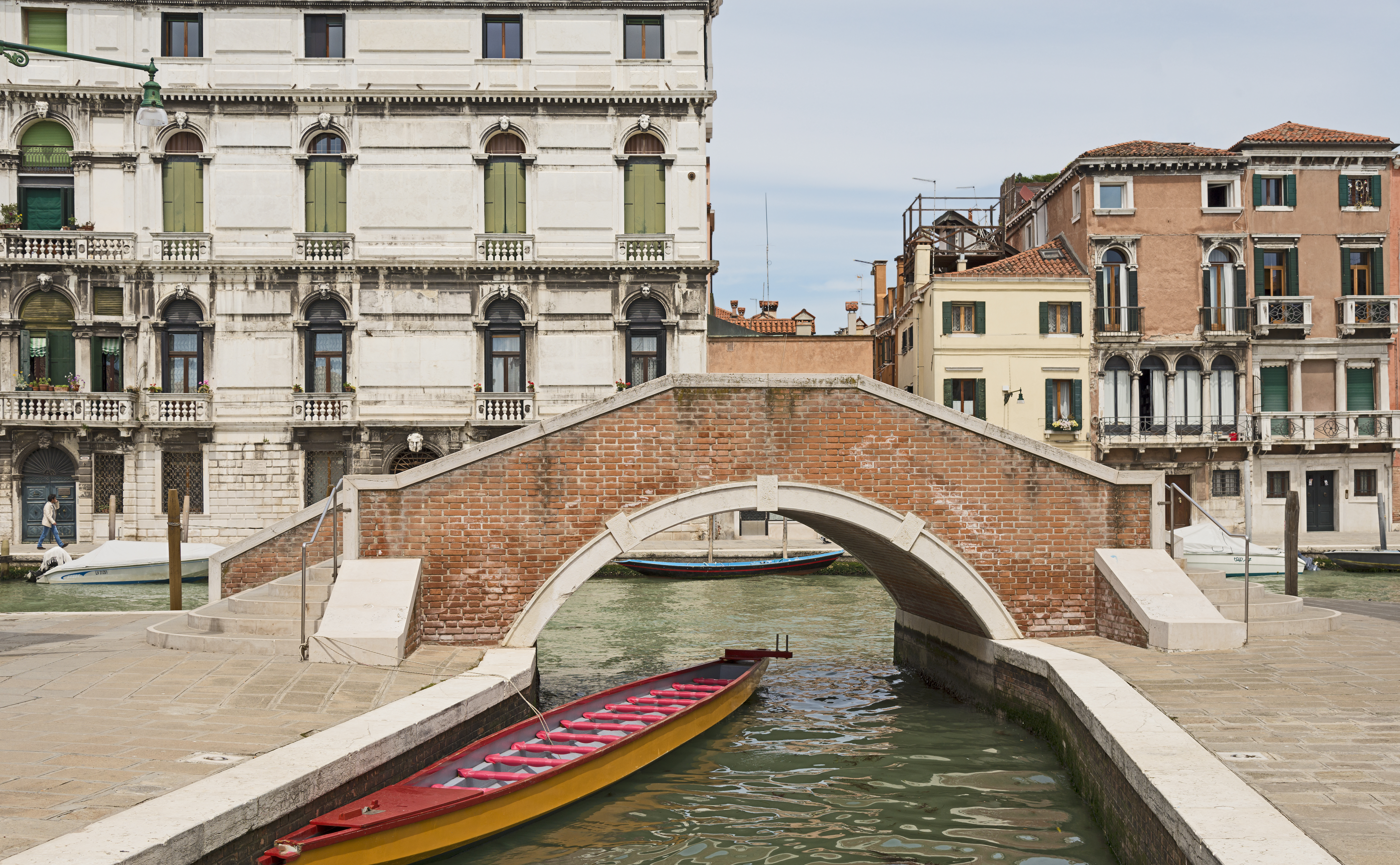
Ponte de la Crea/Ospisio da Ponte
Rio de la Crea

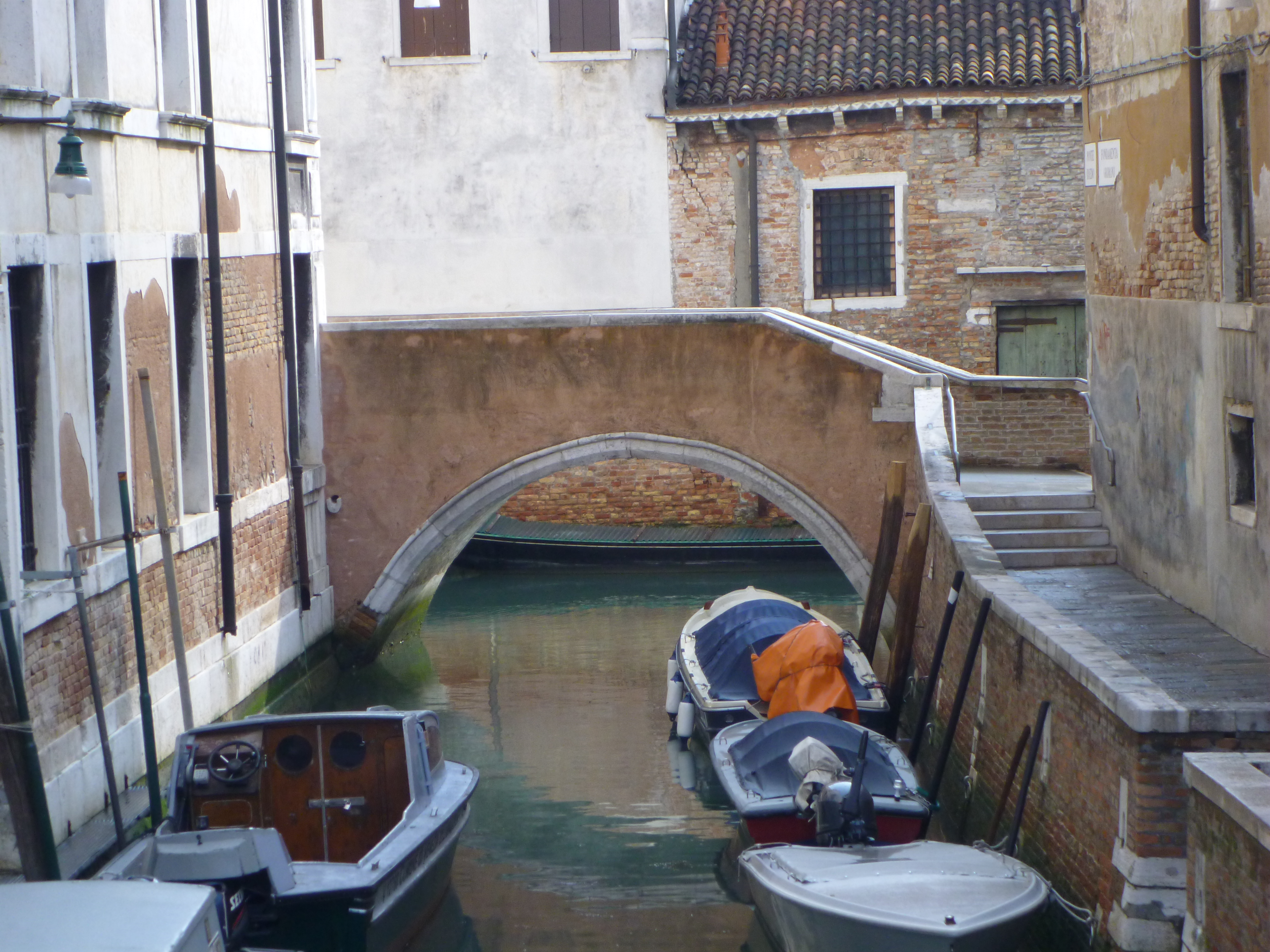
Ponte Diedo
Rio del Trapolin et parallèle au rio dei Servi

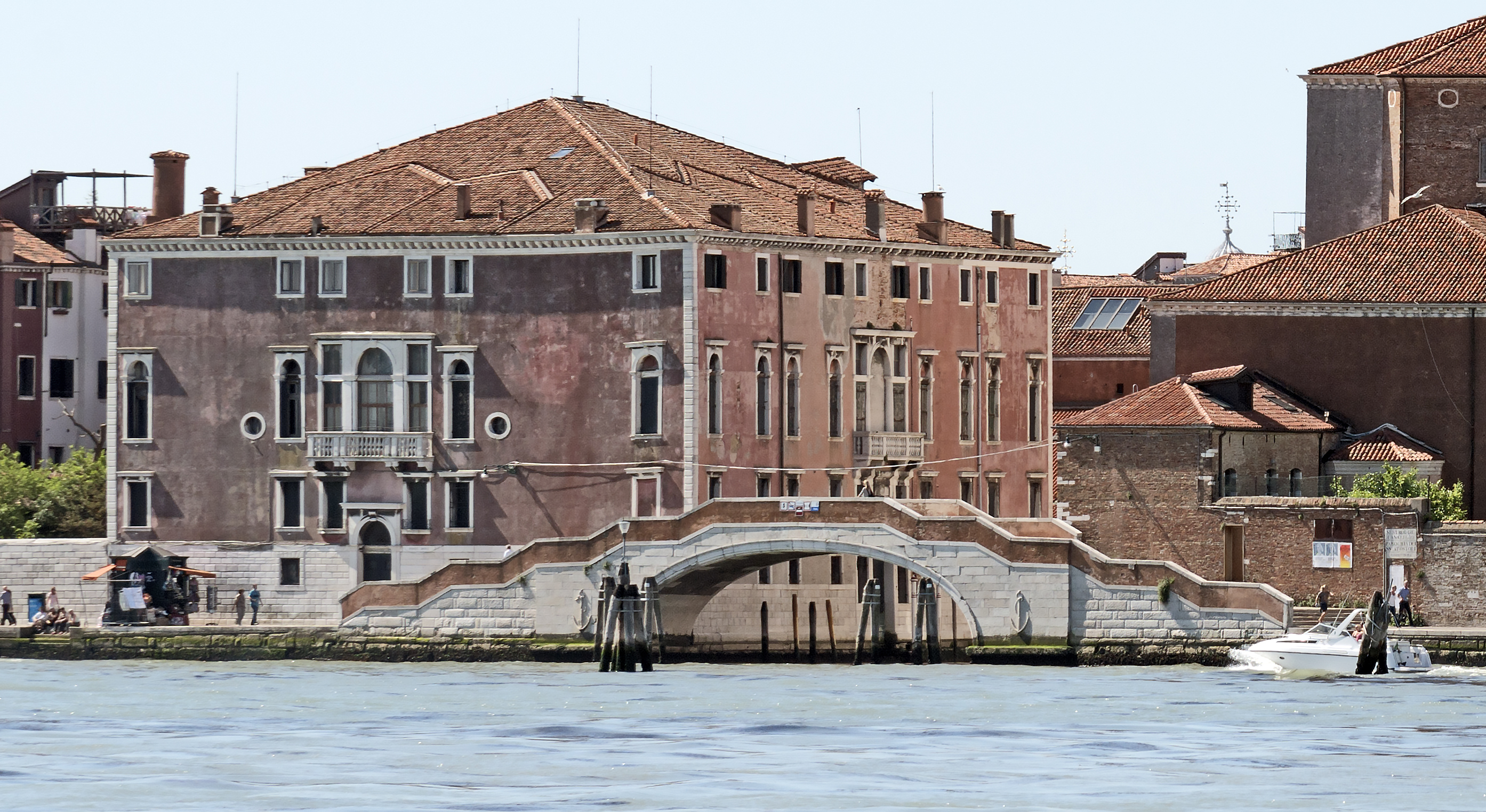
Ponte Donà
Rio dei Gesuiti

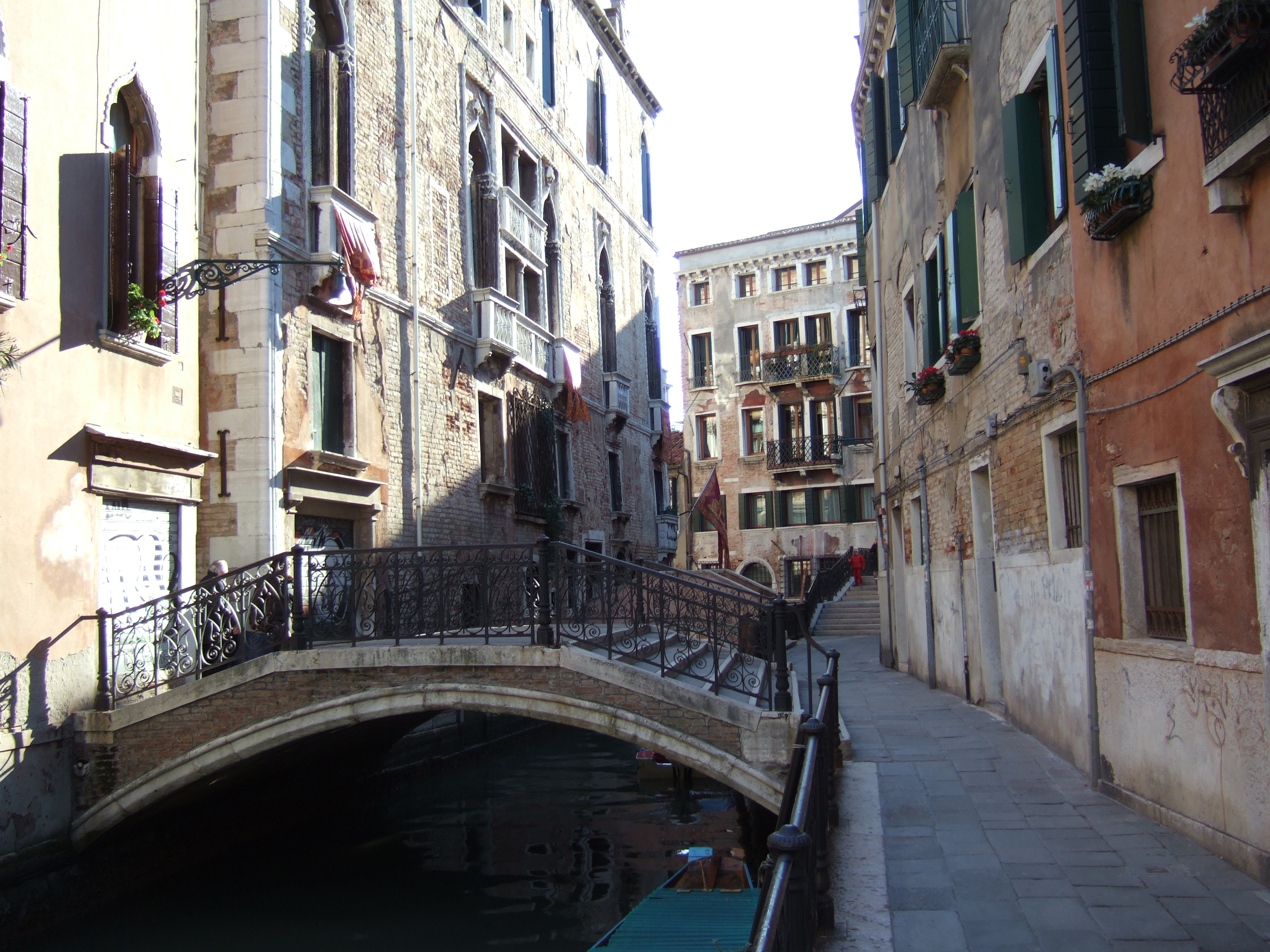
Ponte de le Erbe
Rio de la Panada

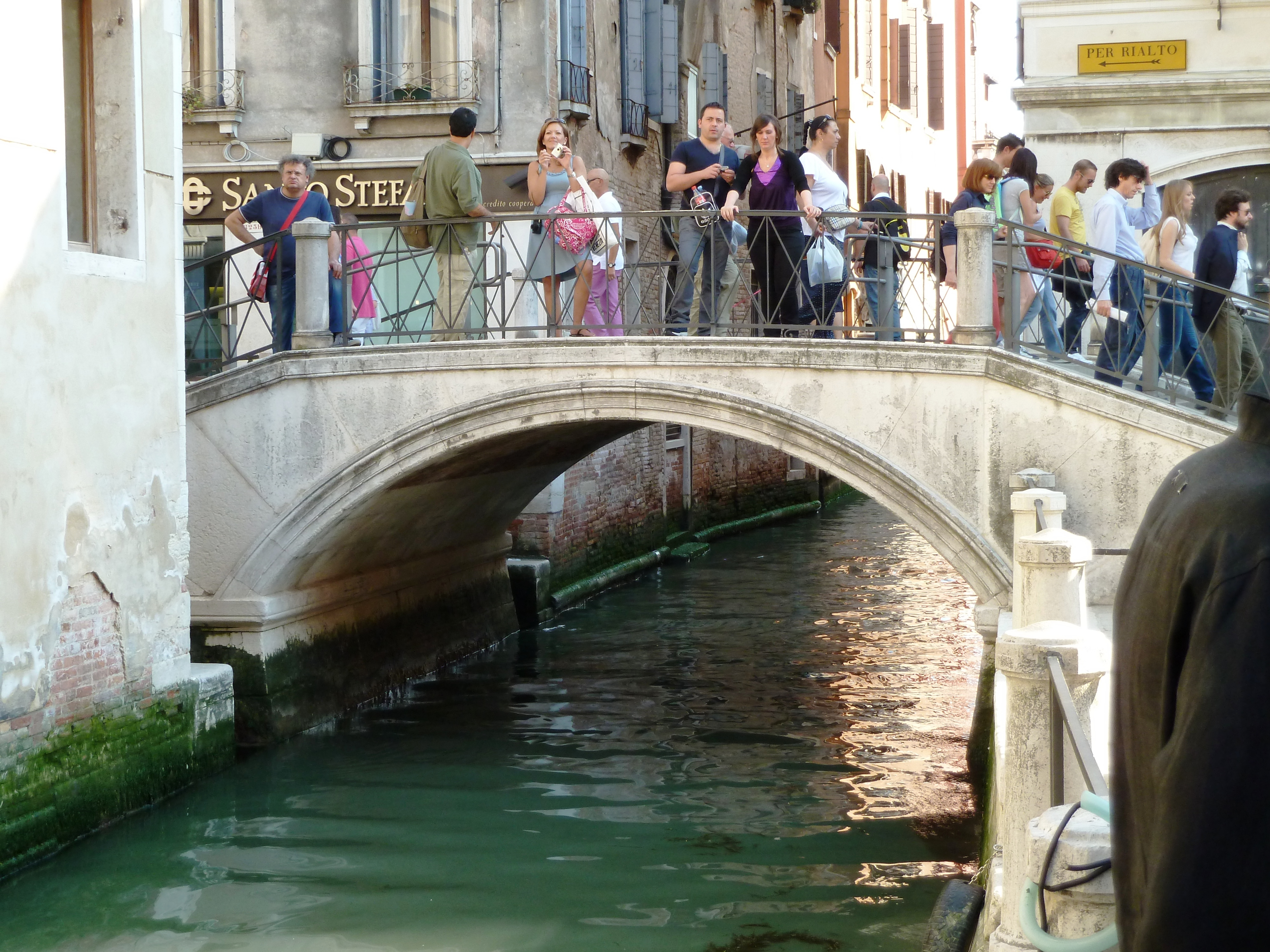
Ponte San Felice
Rio de San Felice

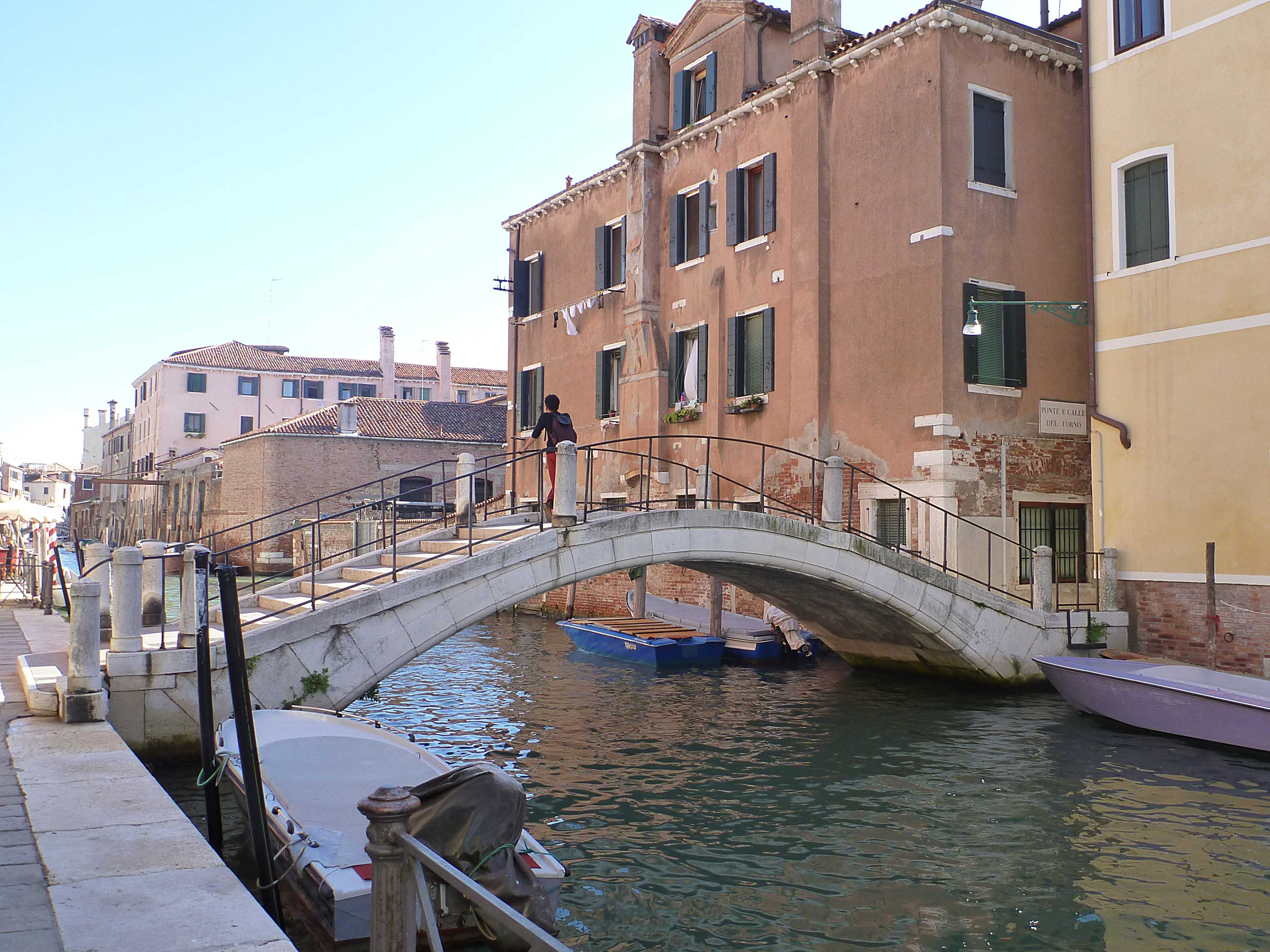
Ponte del Forno
Rio de la Sensa

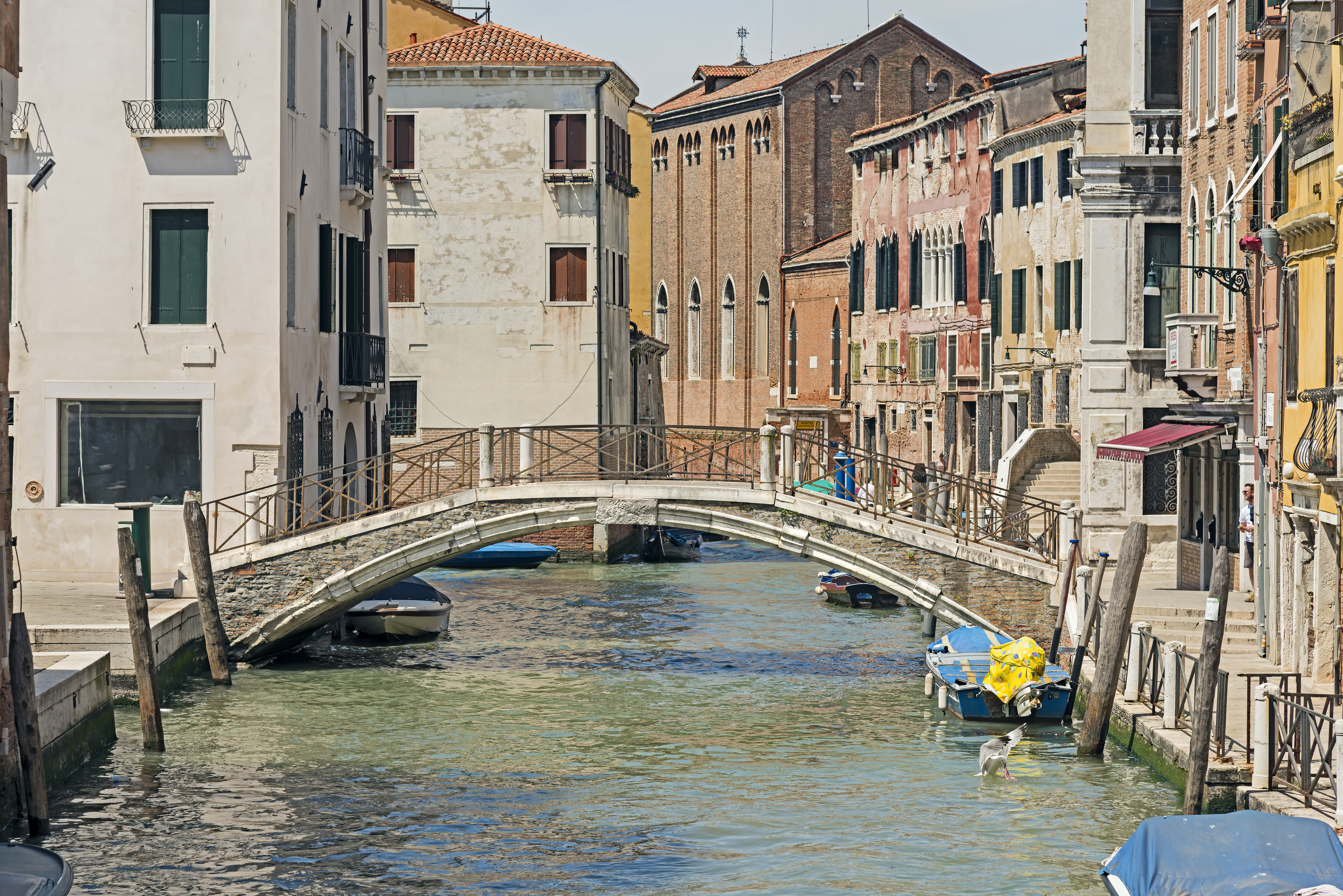
Ponte Santa Fosca
Rio de Santa Fosca

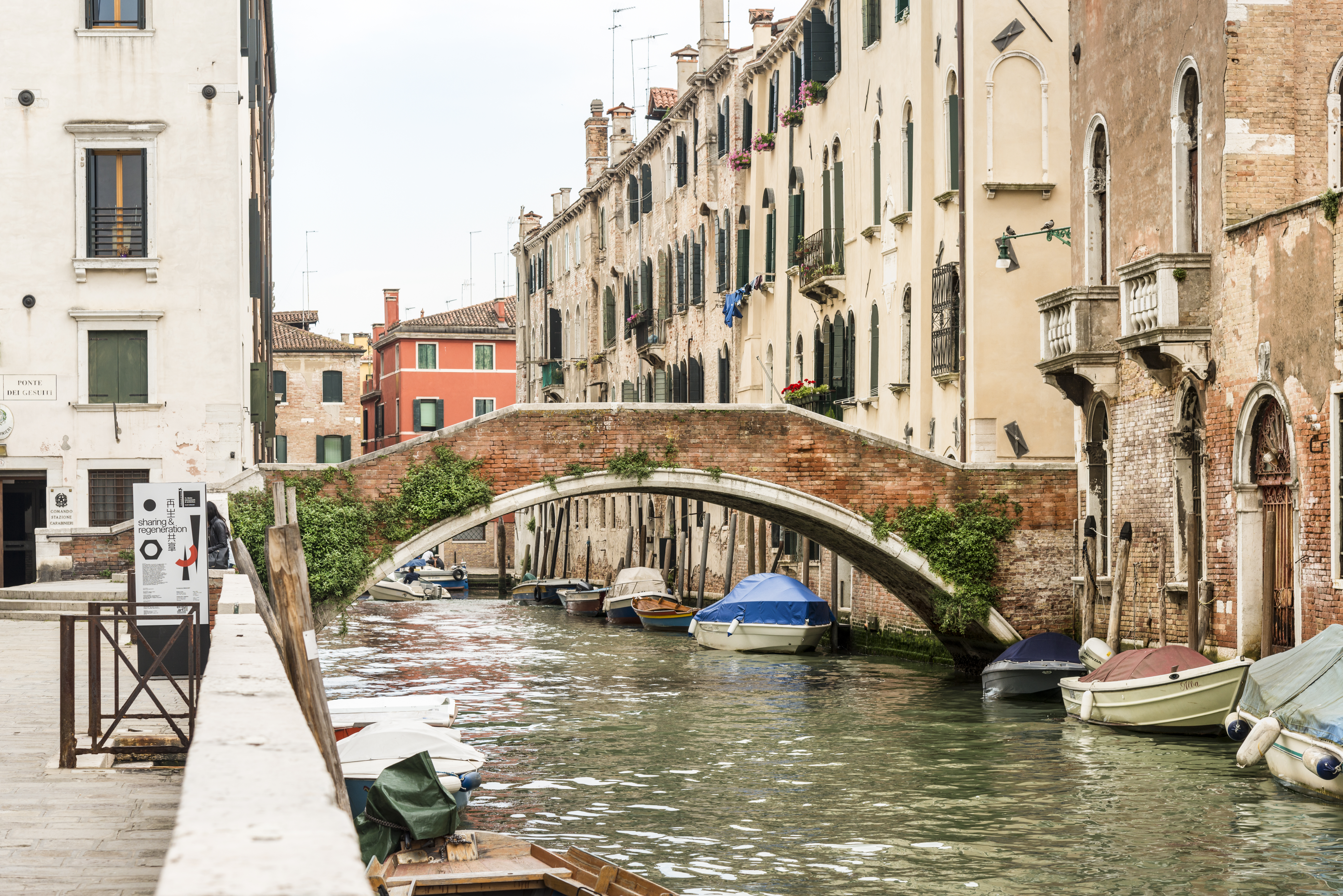
Ponte dei Gesuiti
Rio de Santa Caterina

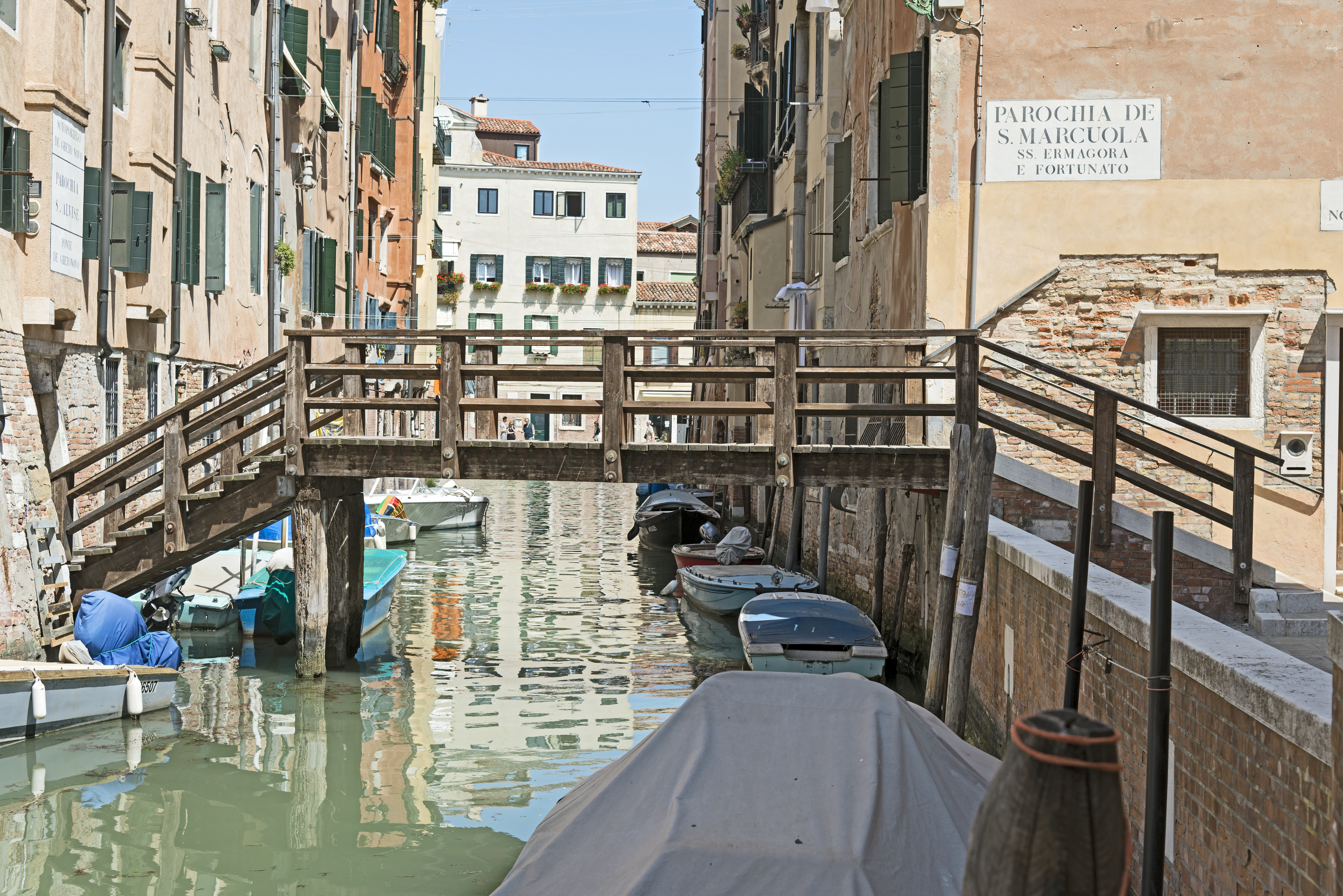
Ponte del Gheto Novissimo
Rio del Gheto

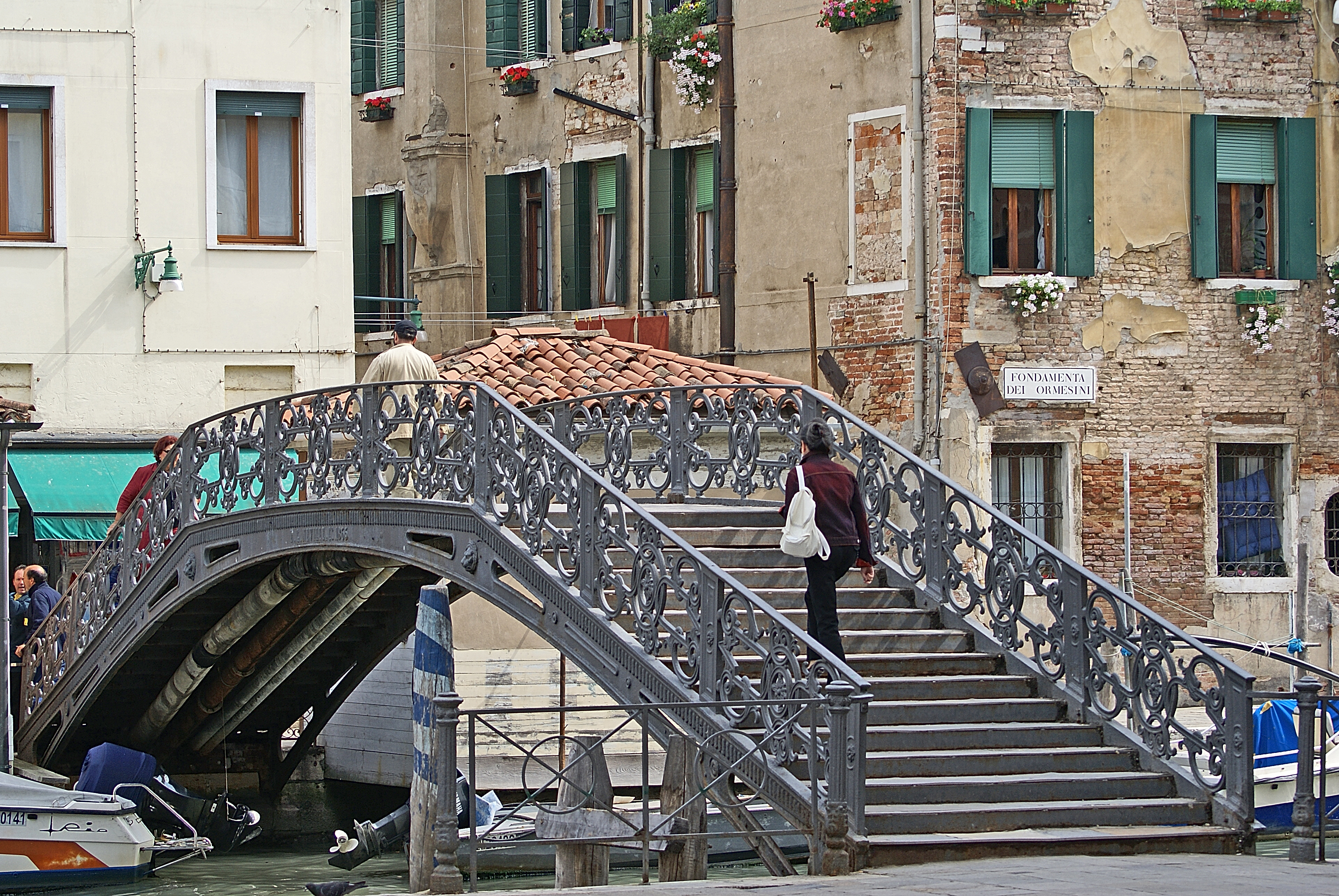
Ponte de Gheto Novo
Rio de San Girolamo et rio dei Ormesini

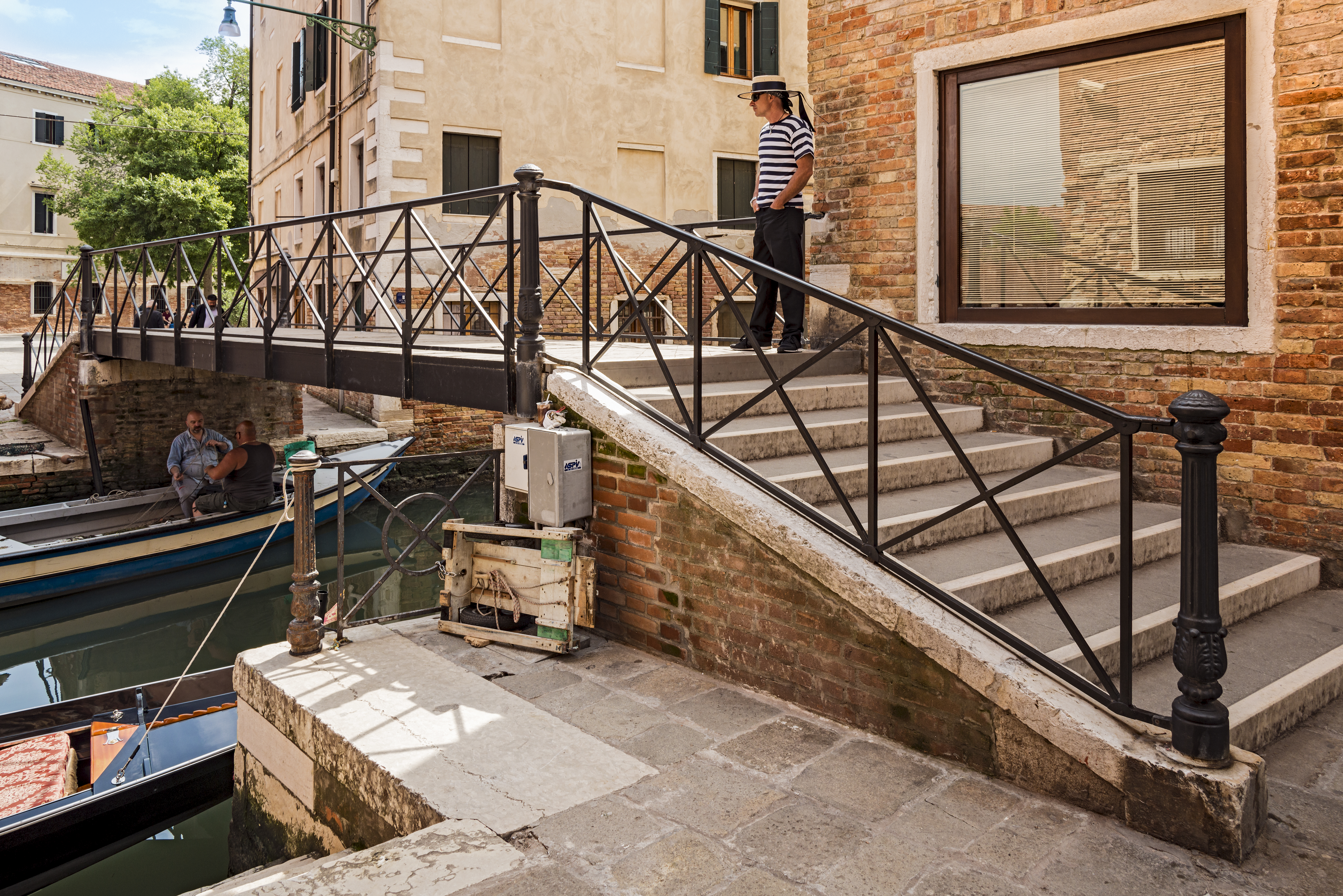
Ponte del Gheto Vechio
Rio del Gheto

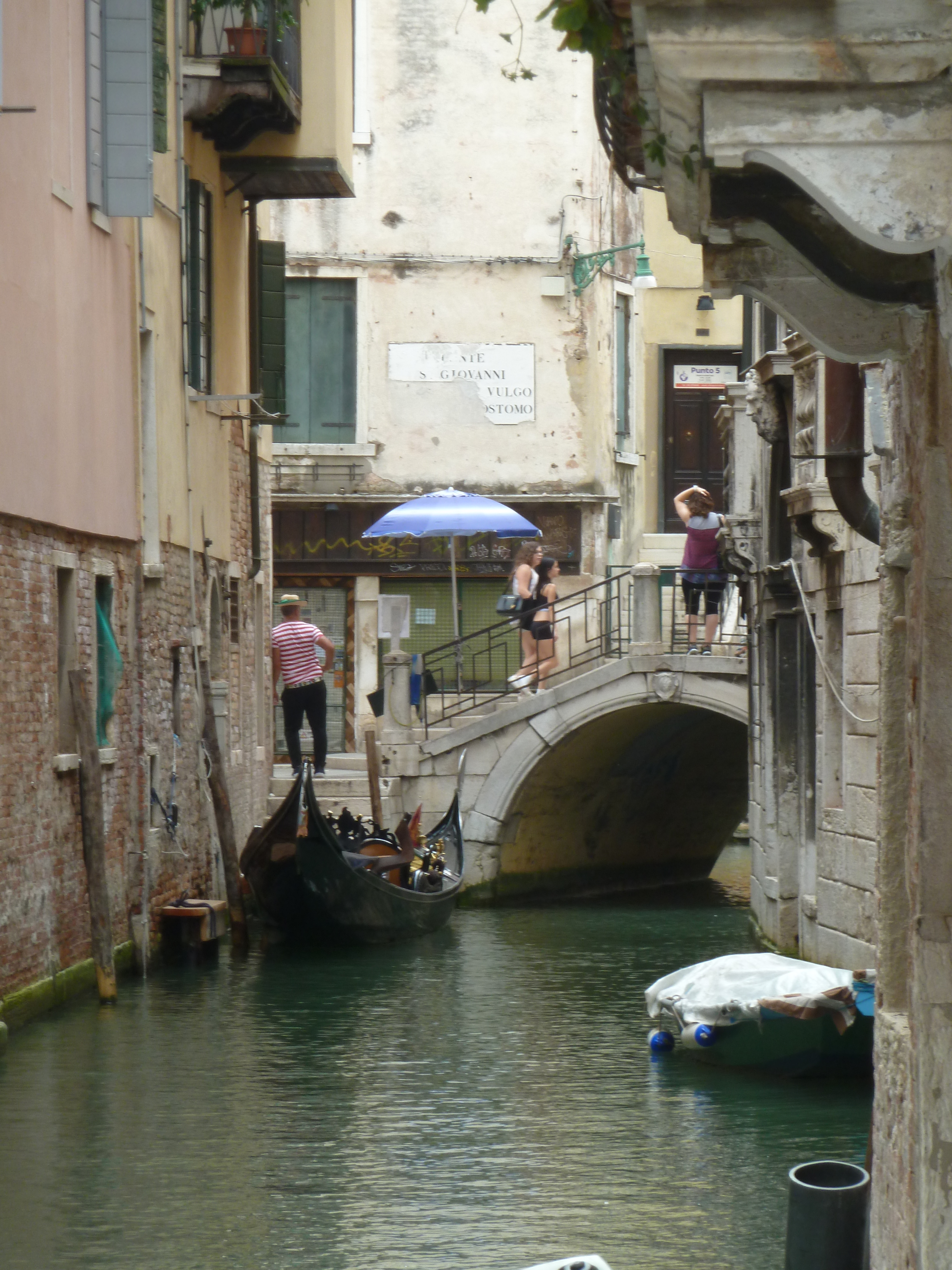
Ponte San Giovanni Grisostomo
Rio de San Giovanni Crisostomo

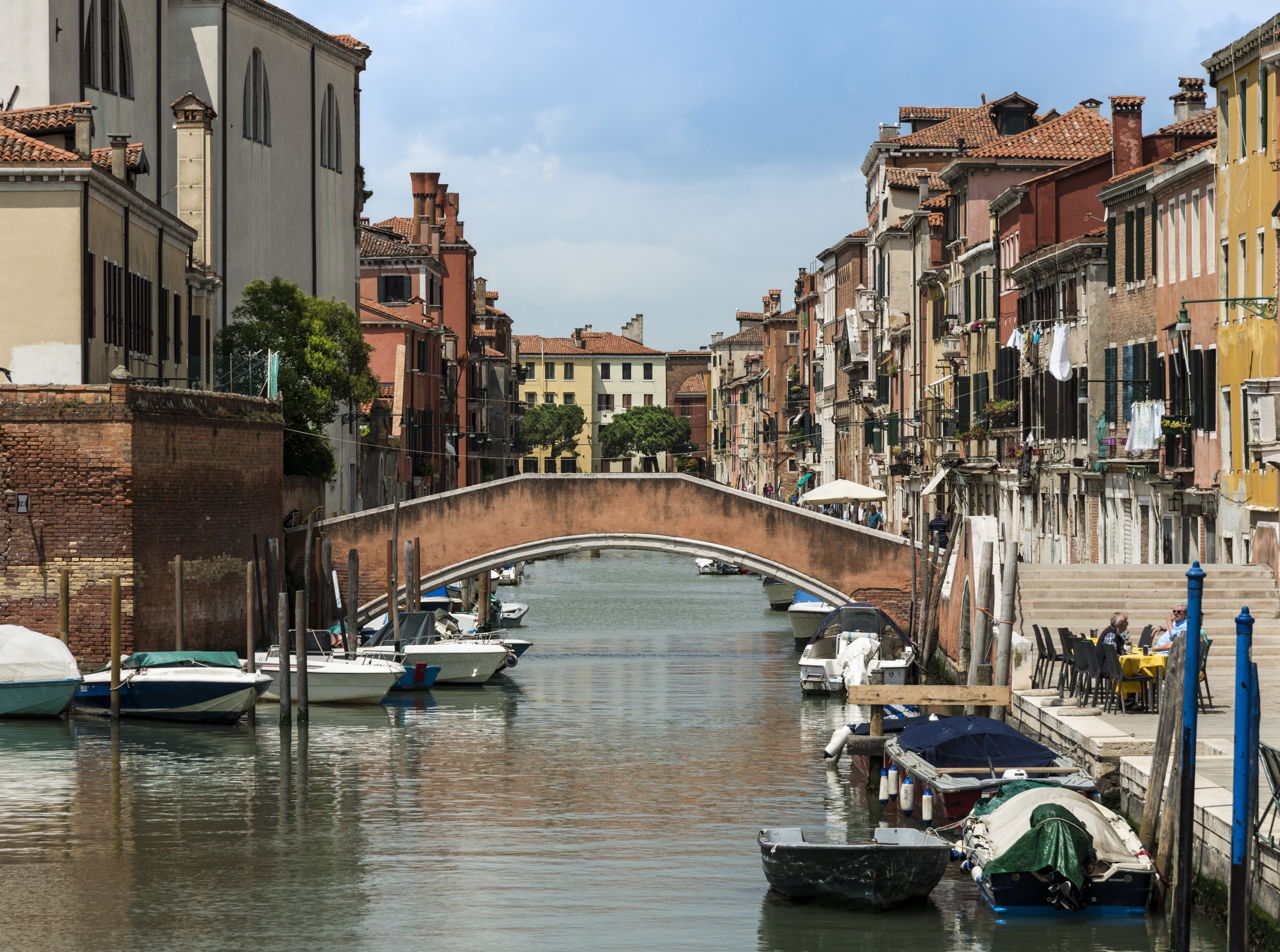
Ponte San Girolamo
Rio de San Girolamo

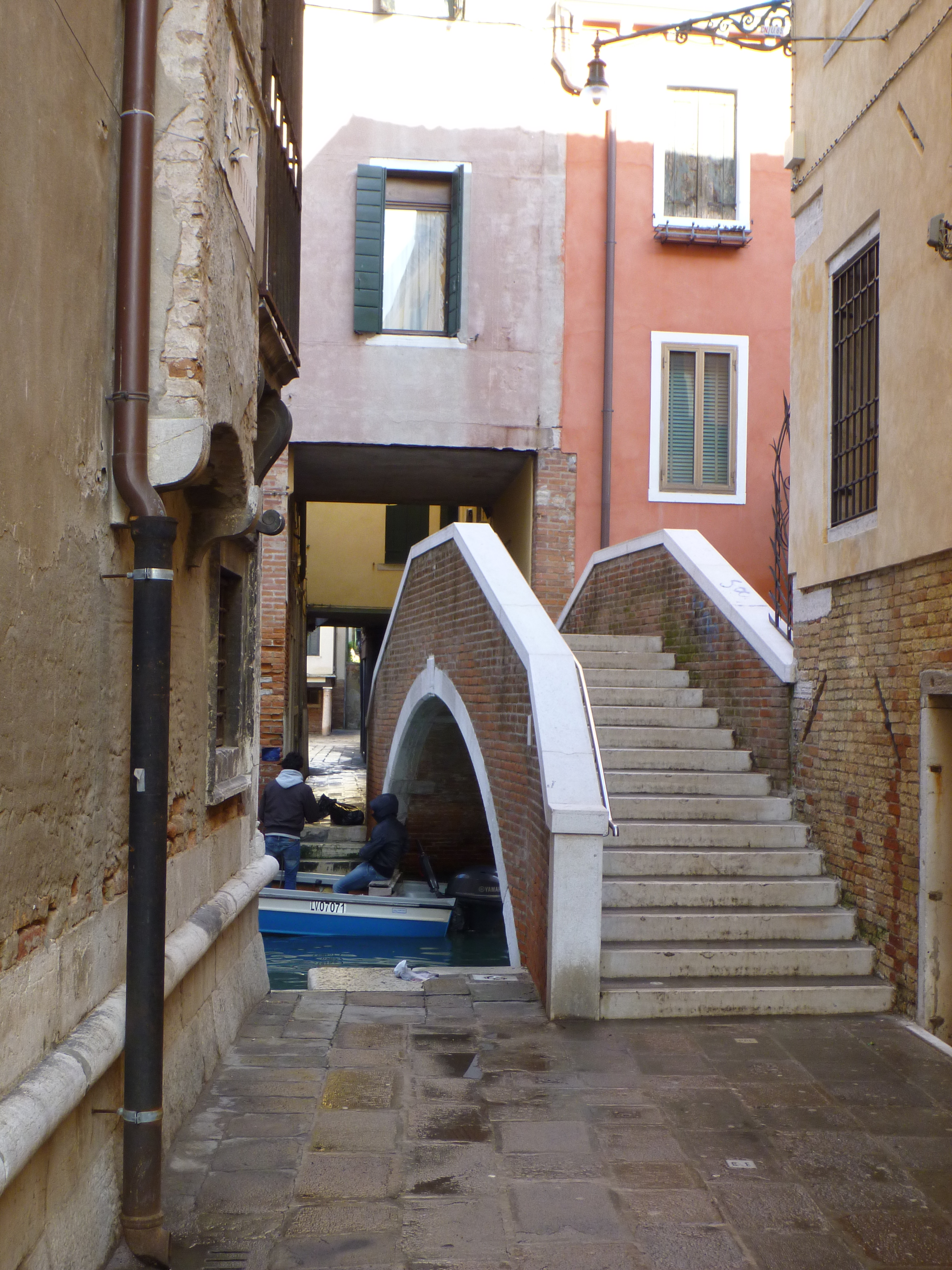
Ponte Giustinian
Rio dei Santi Apostoli

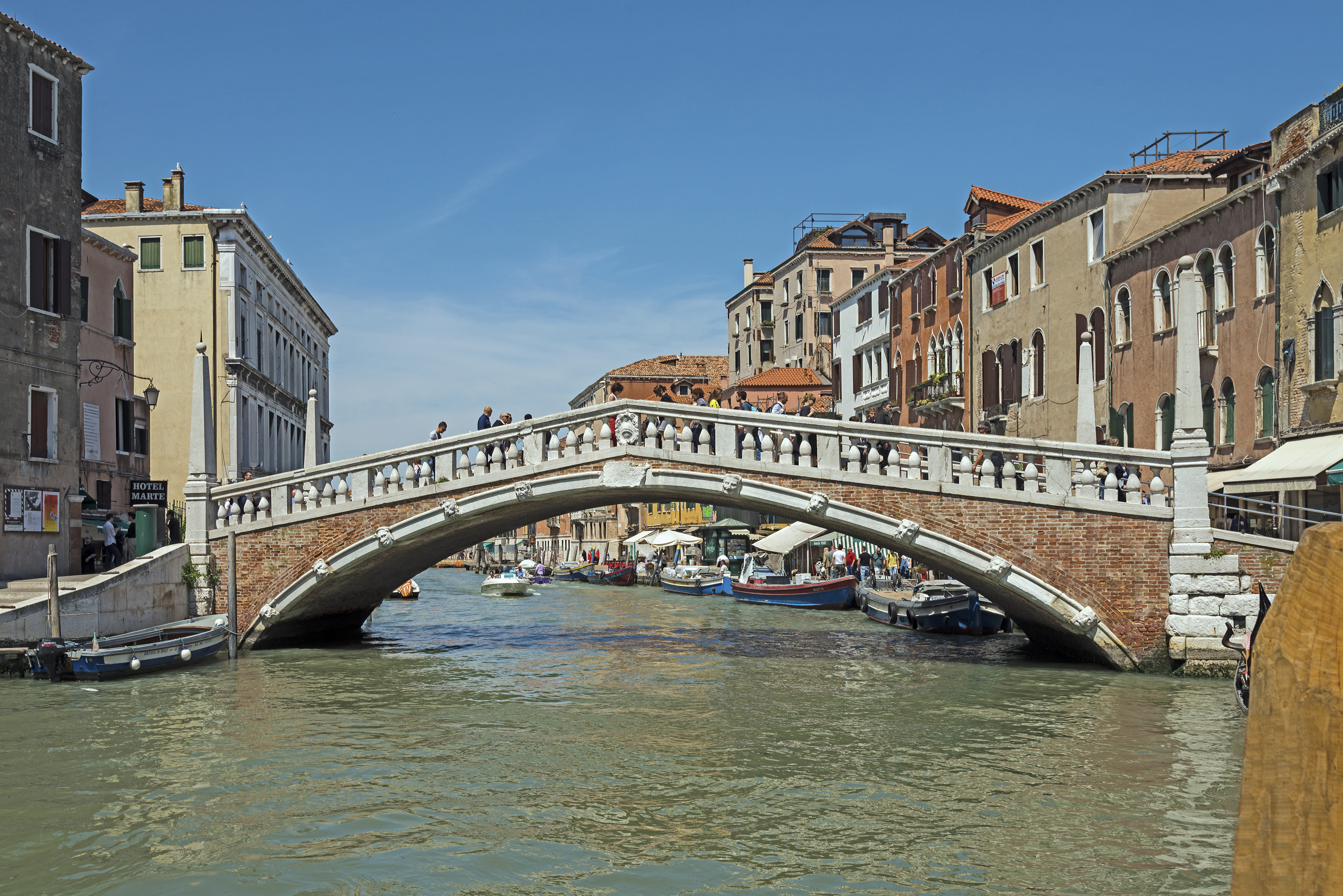
Ponte delle Guglie
Canal de Cannaregio

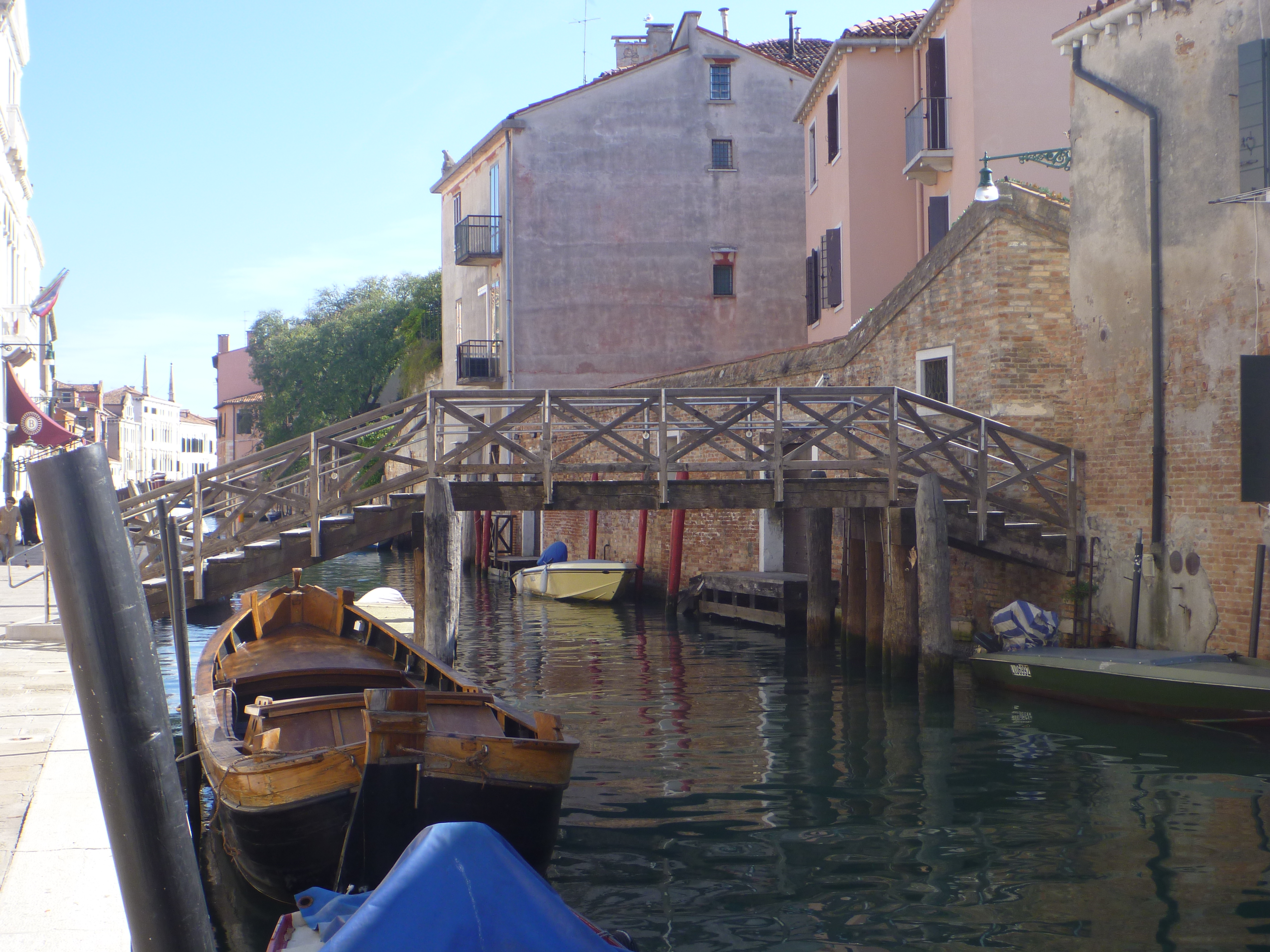
Ponte Loredan alla Madonna dell'Orto
Rio de la Madona de l'Orto

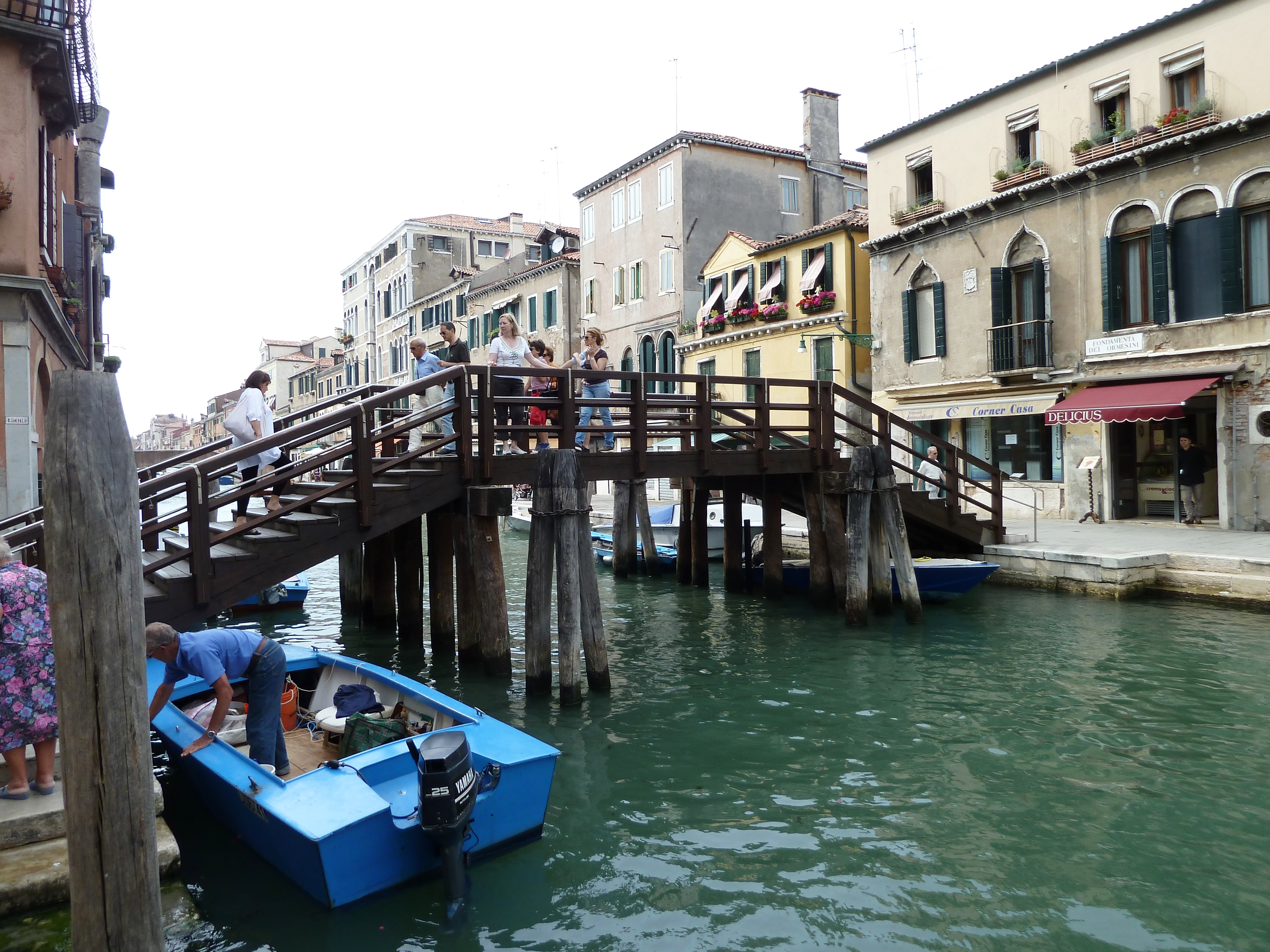
Ponte Loredan agli Ormesini
Rio de San Girolamo

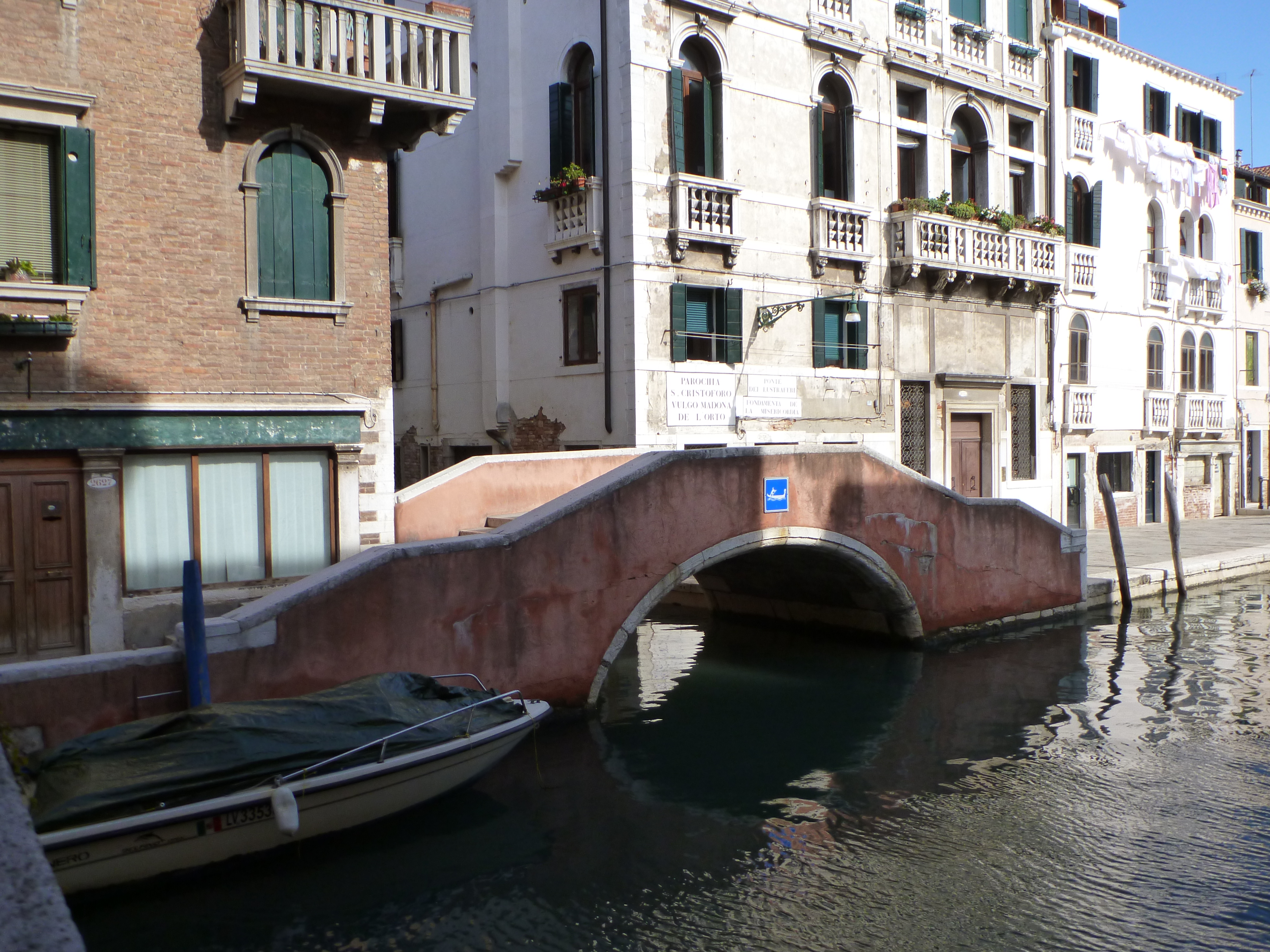
Ponte dei Lustraferi
Rio dei Lustraferri

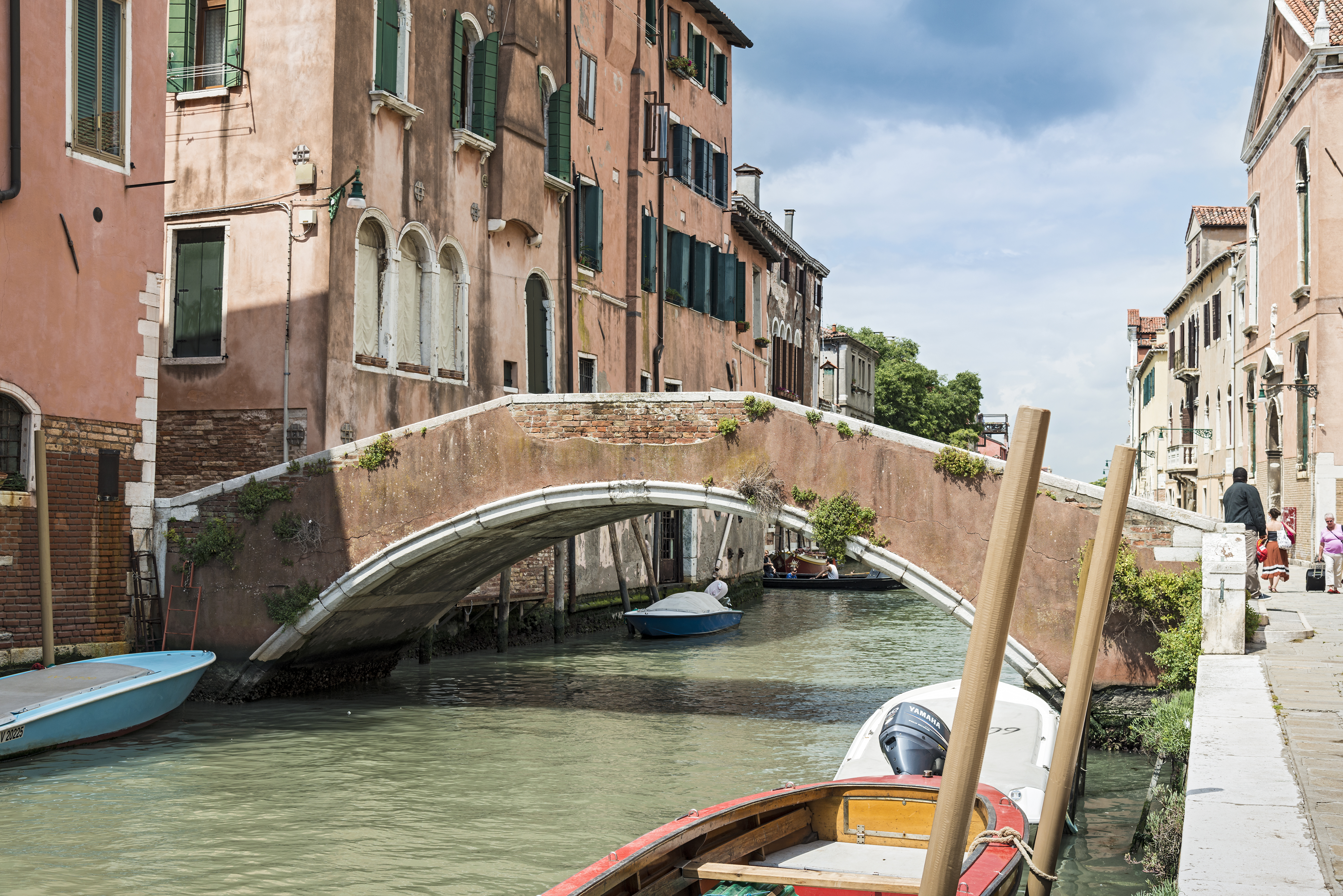
Ponte Madonna dell'Orto
Rio de la Madona de l'Orto

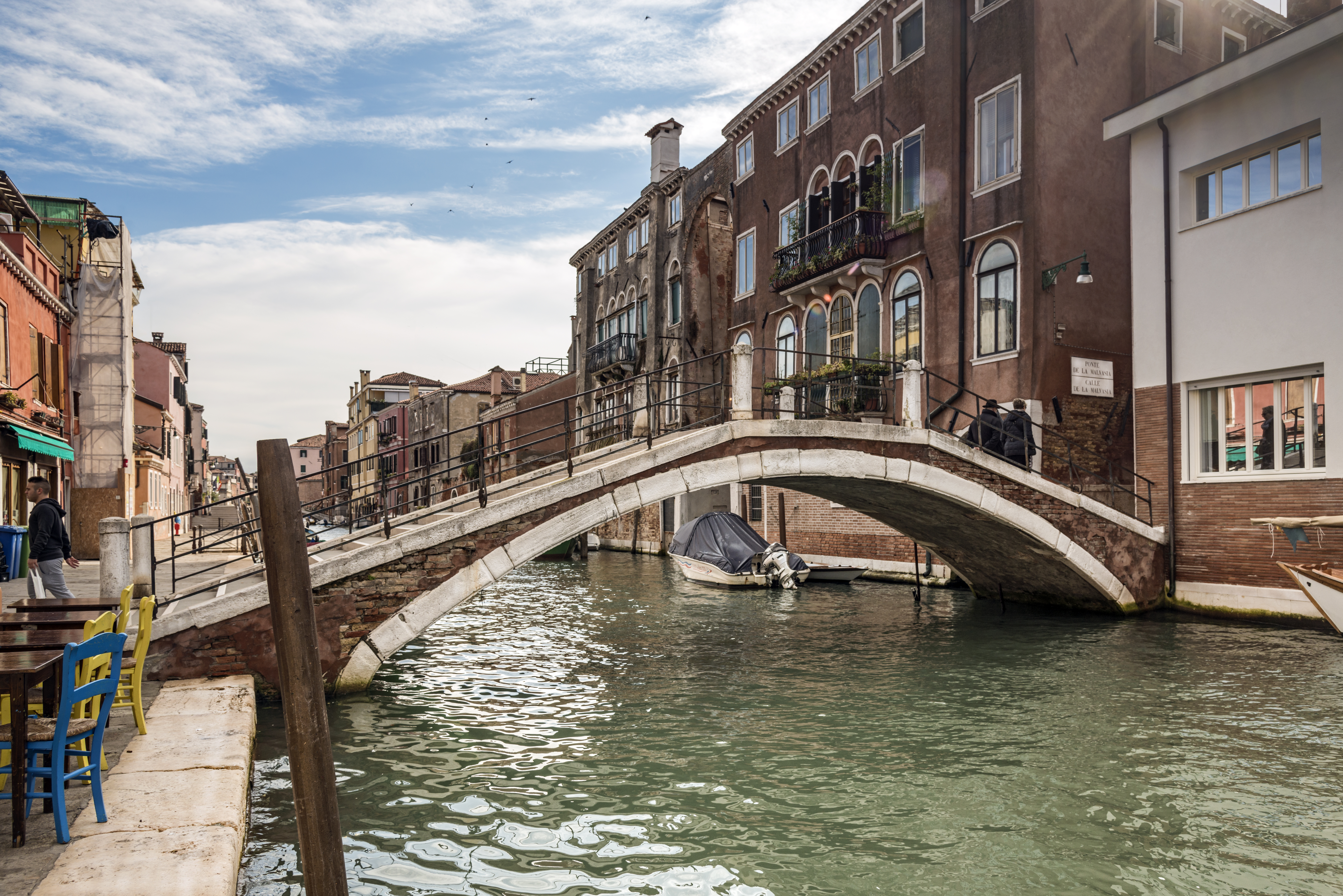
Ponte de la Malvasia
Rio de la Sensa

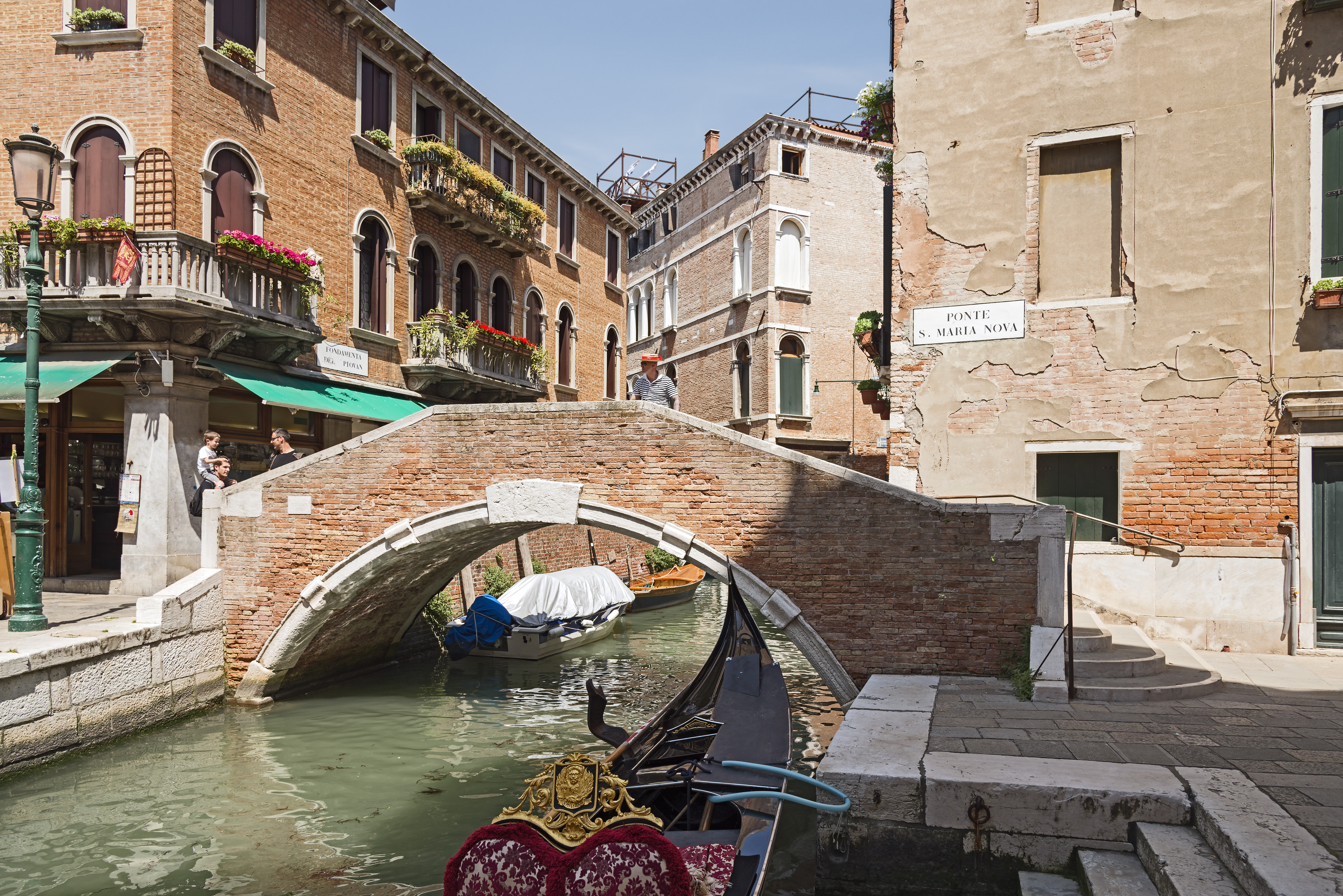
Ponte Santa Maria Nova
Rio dei Miracoli

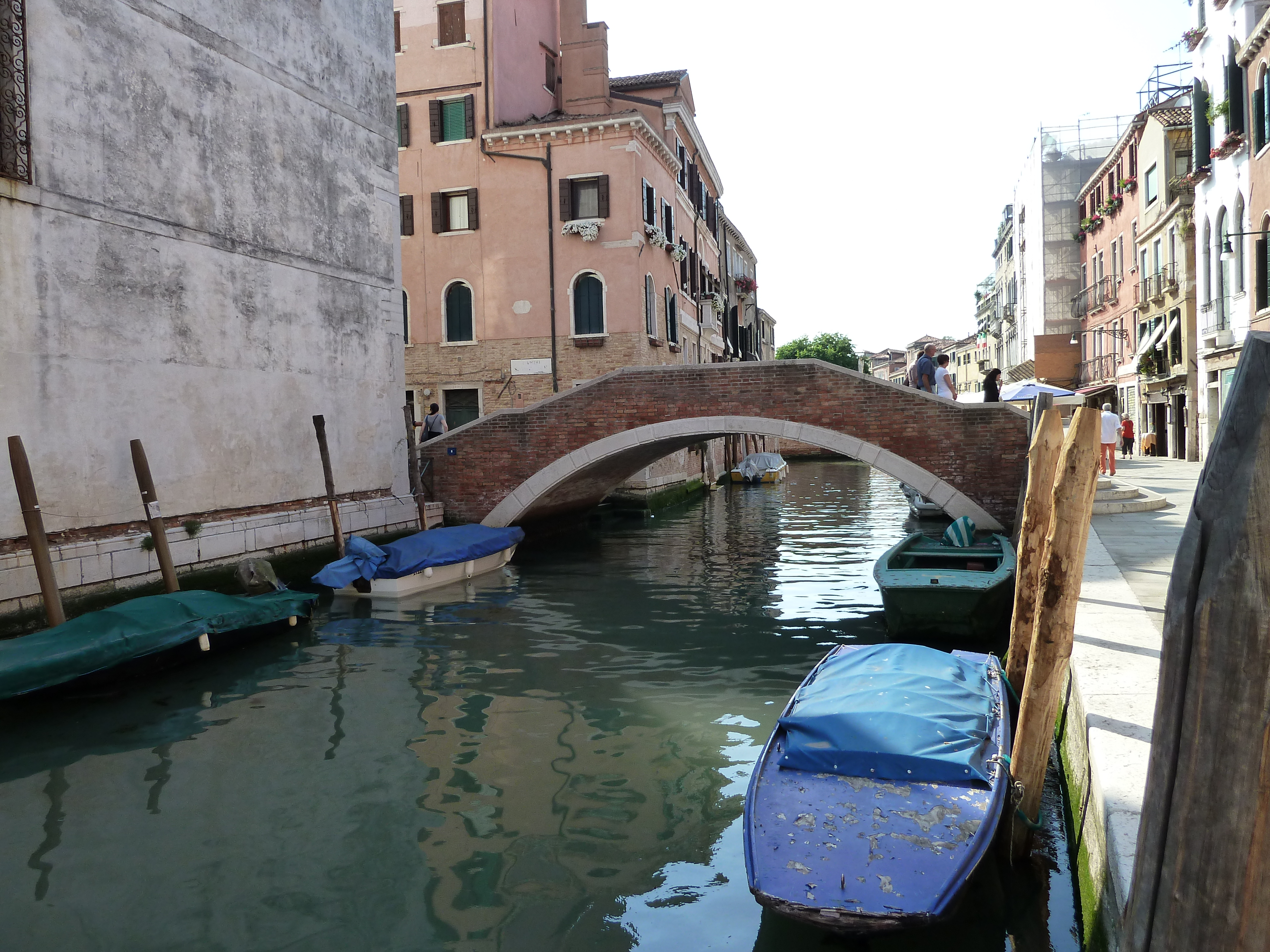
Ponte San Marziale
Rio de la Misericordia

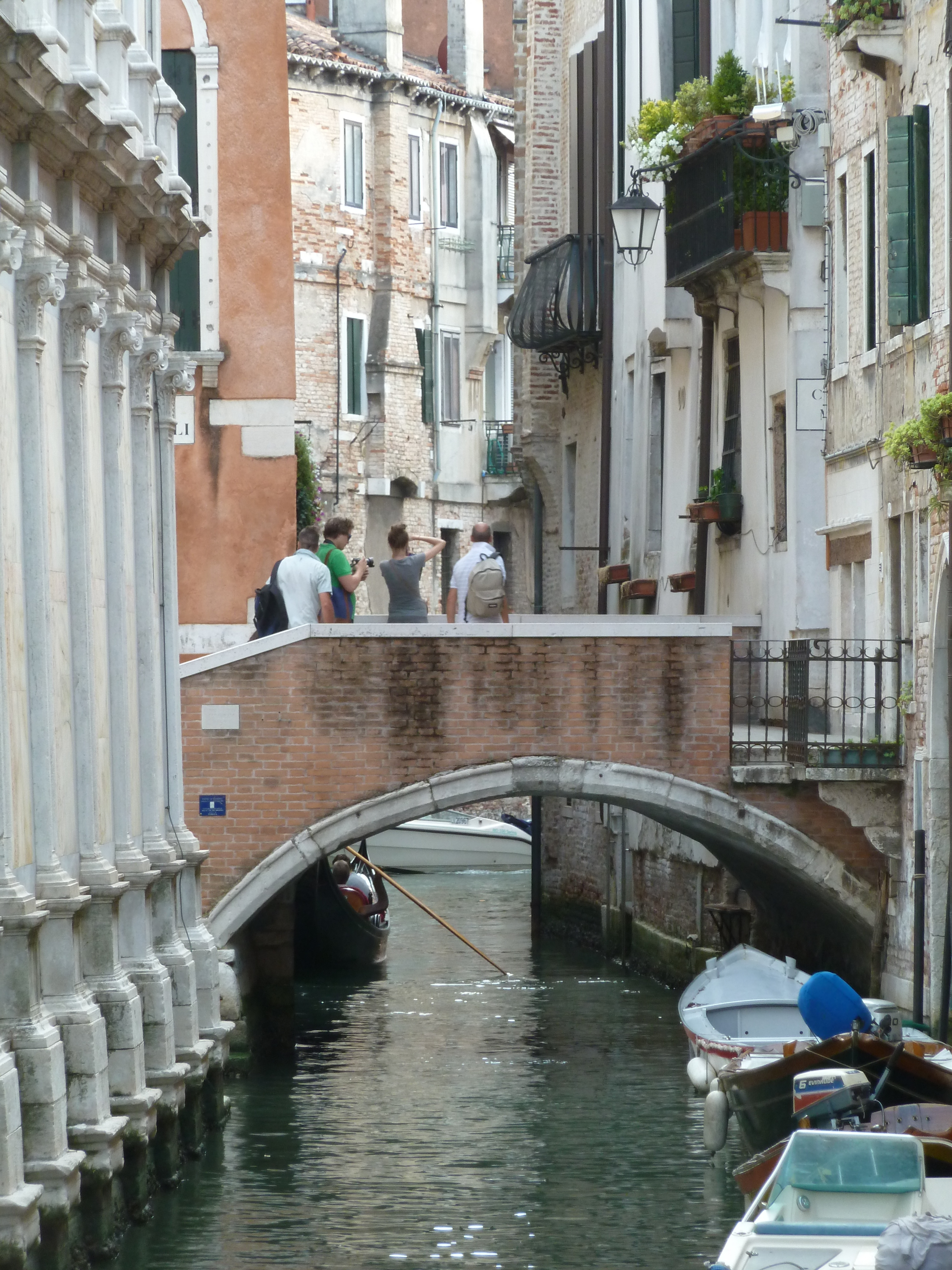
Ponte dei Miracoli
Rio dei Miracoli

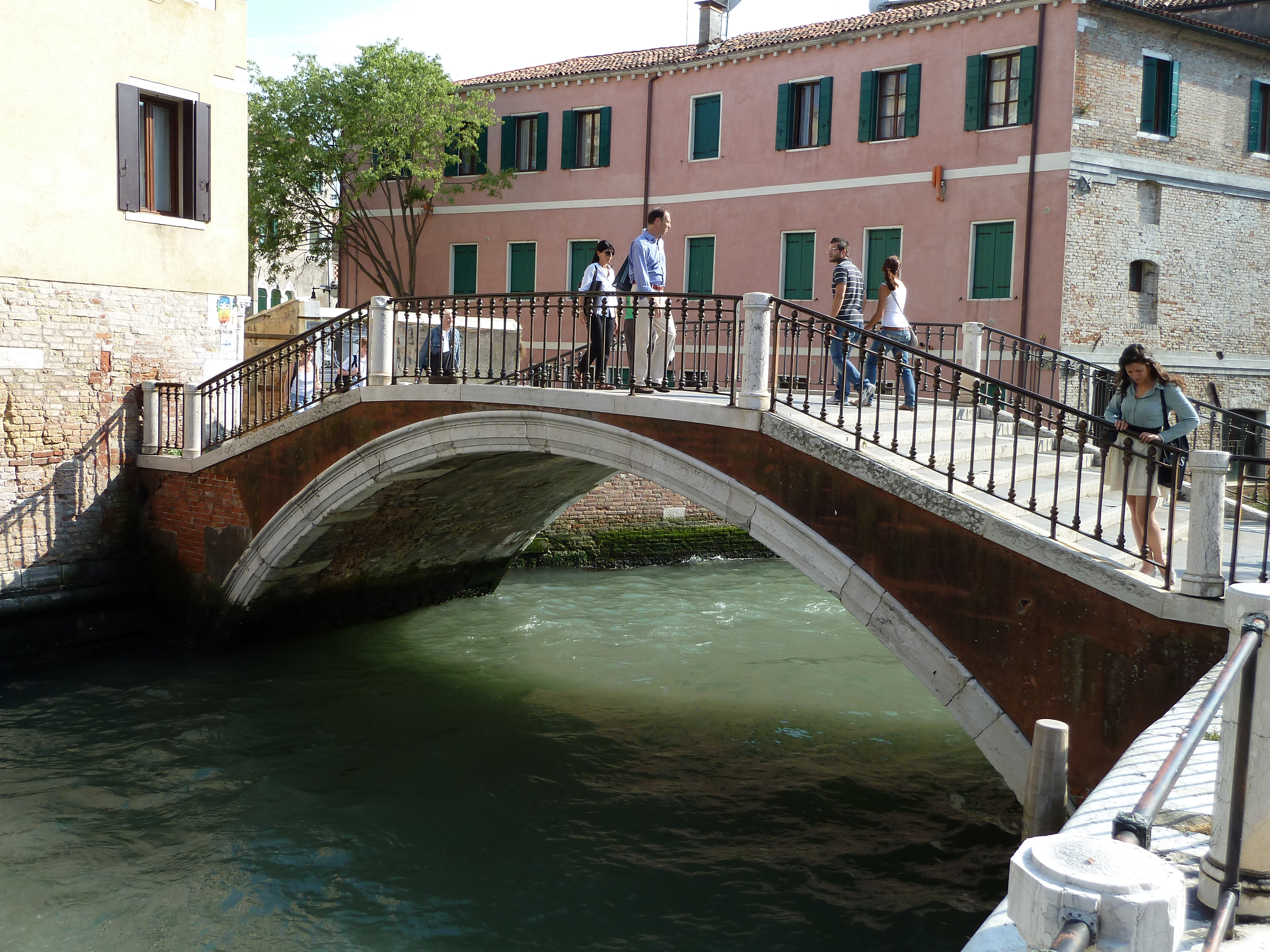
Ponte de la Misericordia
Rio de Noal

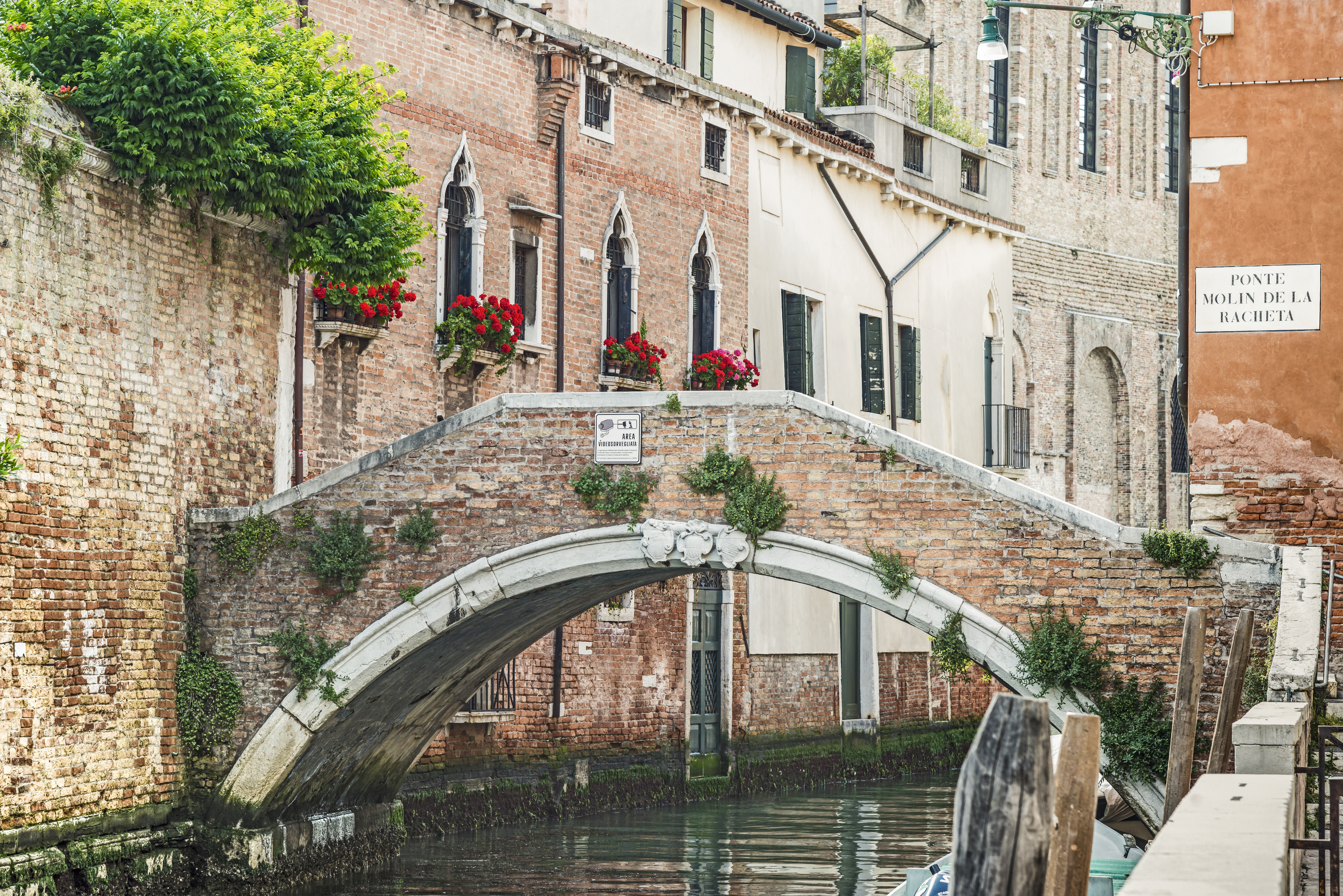
Ponte Molin de la Racheta
Rio de Santa Caterina

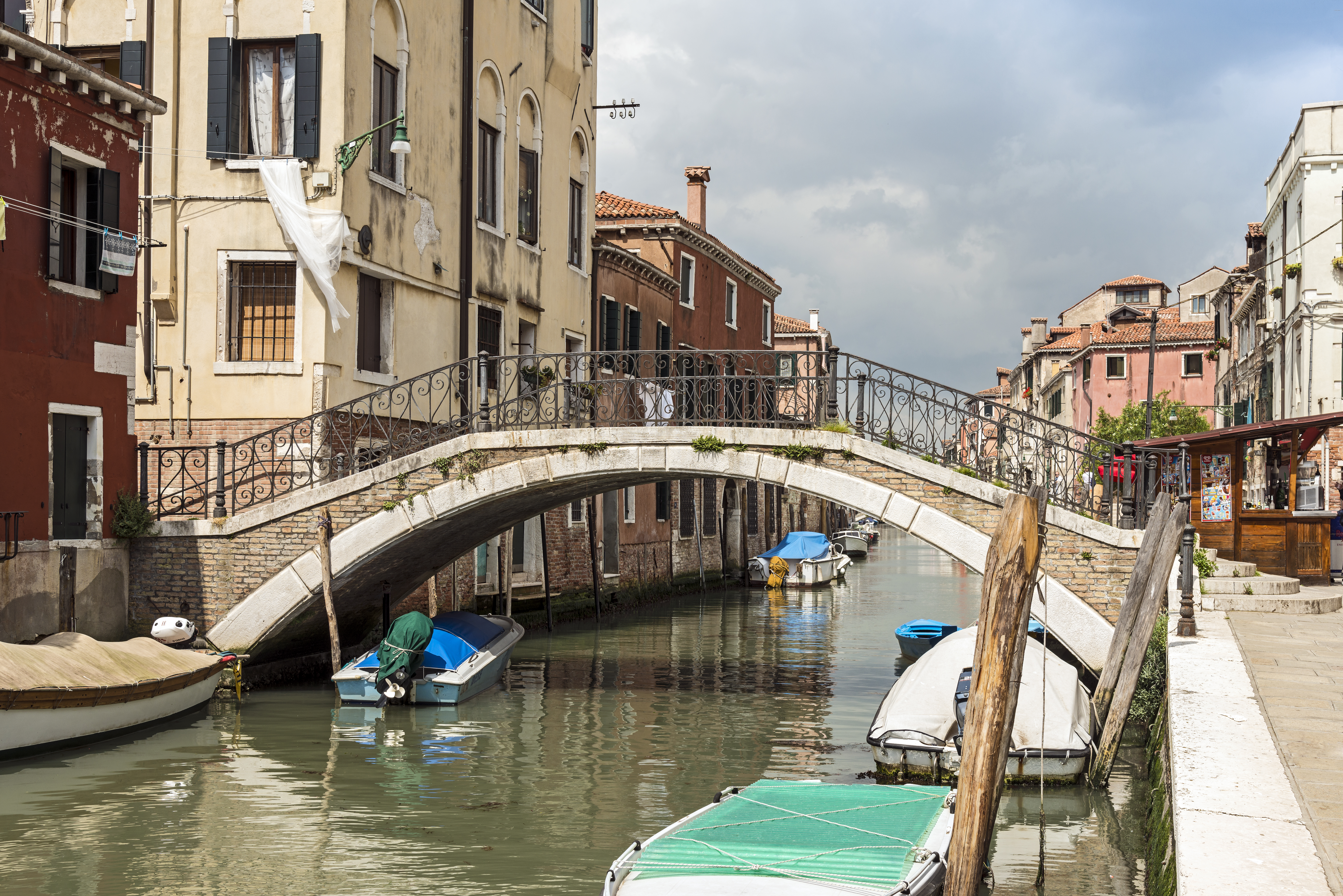
Ponte dei Mori
Rio de la Sensa

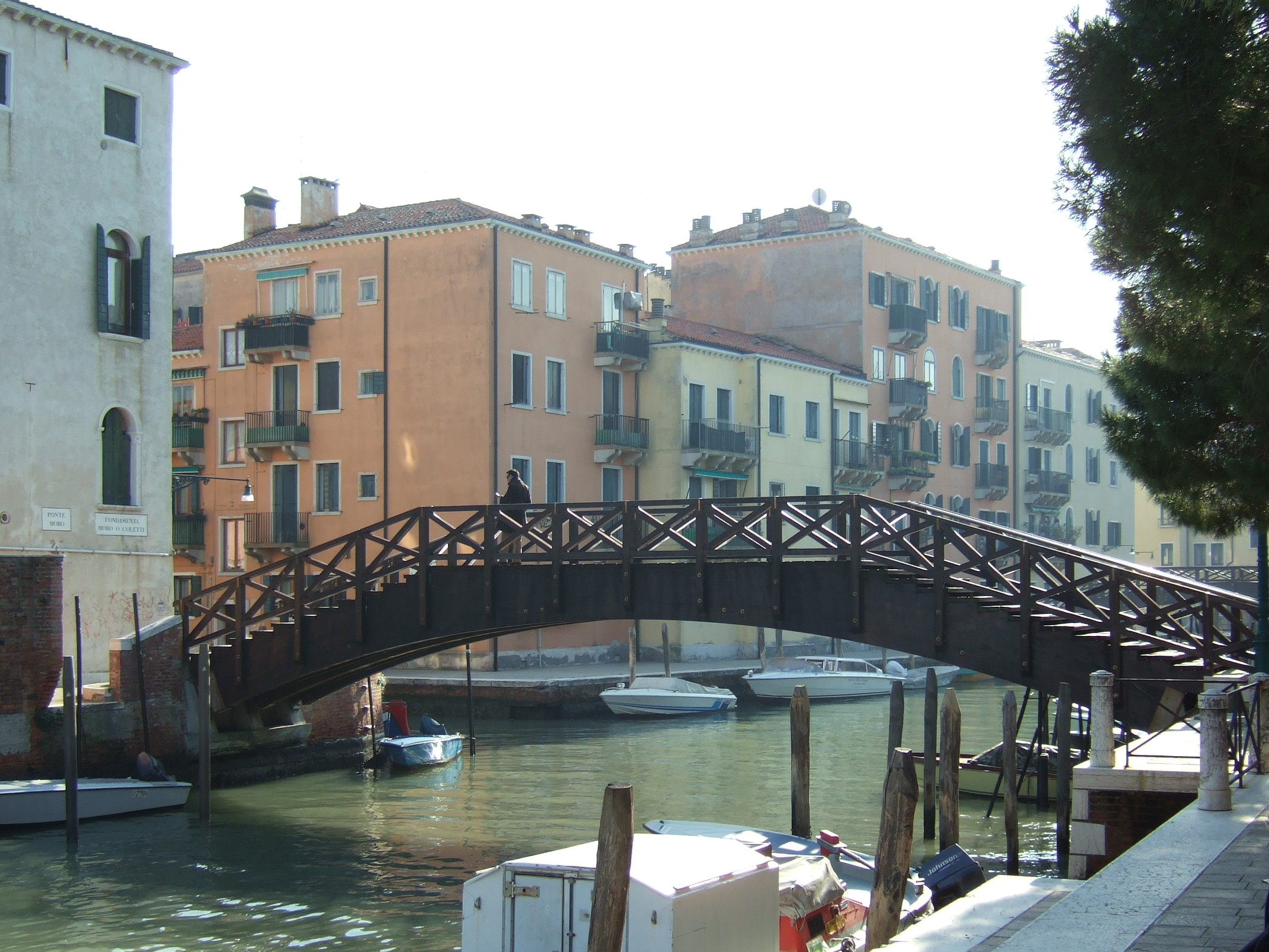
Ponte Moro a San Girolamo
Rio de Ca'Moro

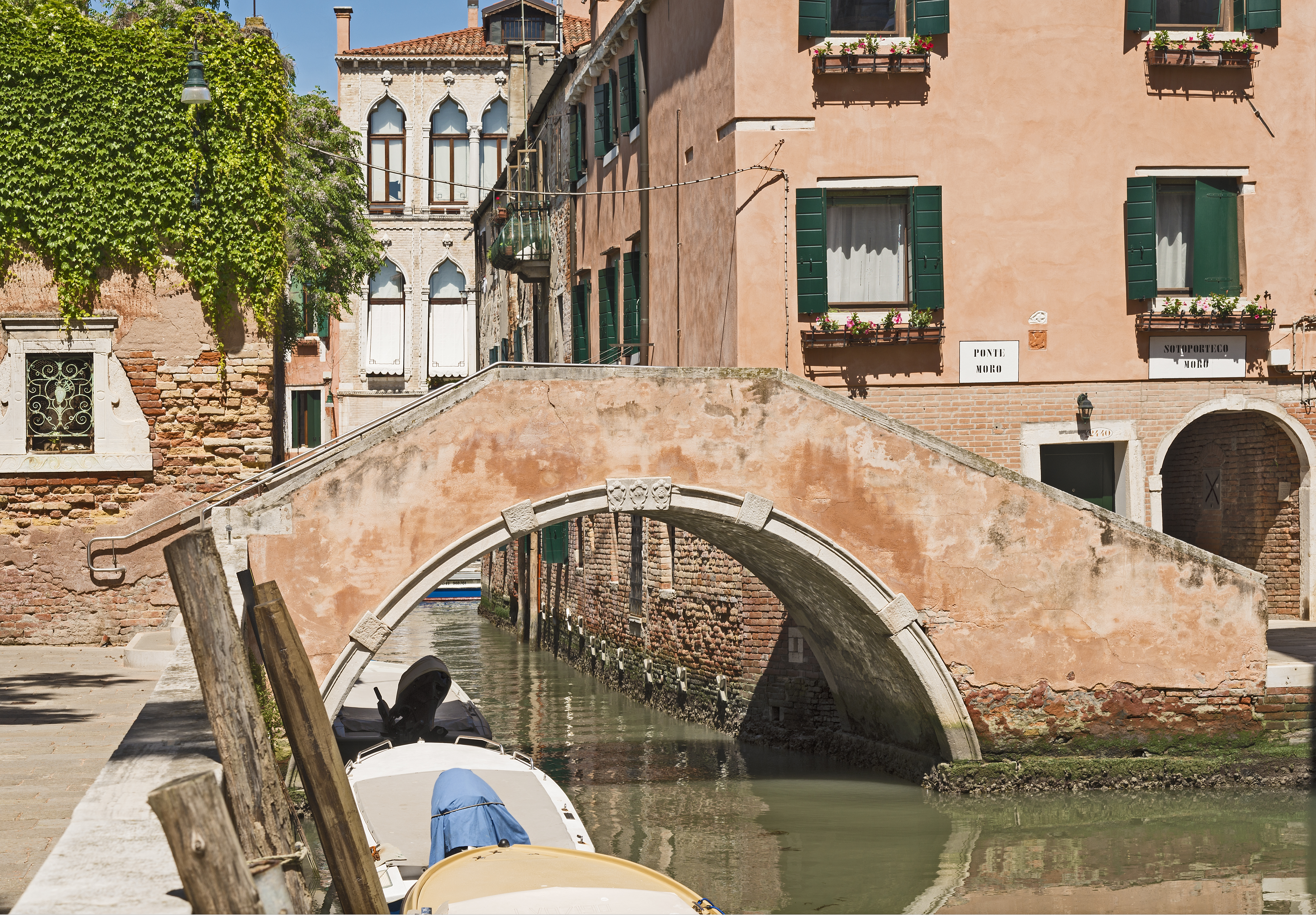
Ponte Moro a San Marziale
Rio del Grimani

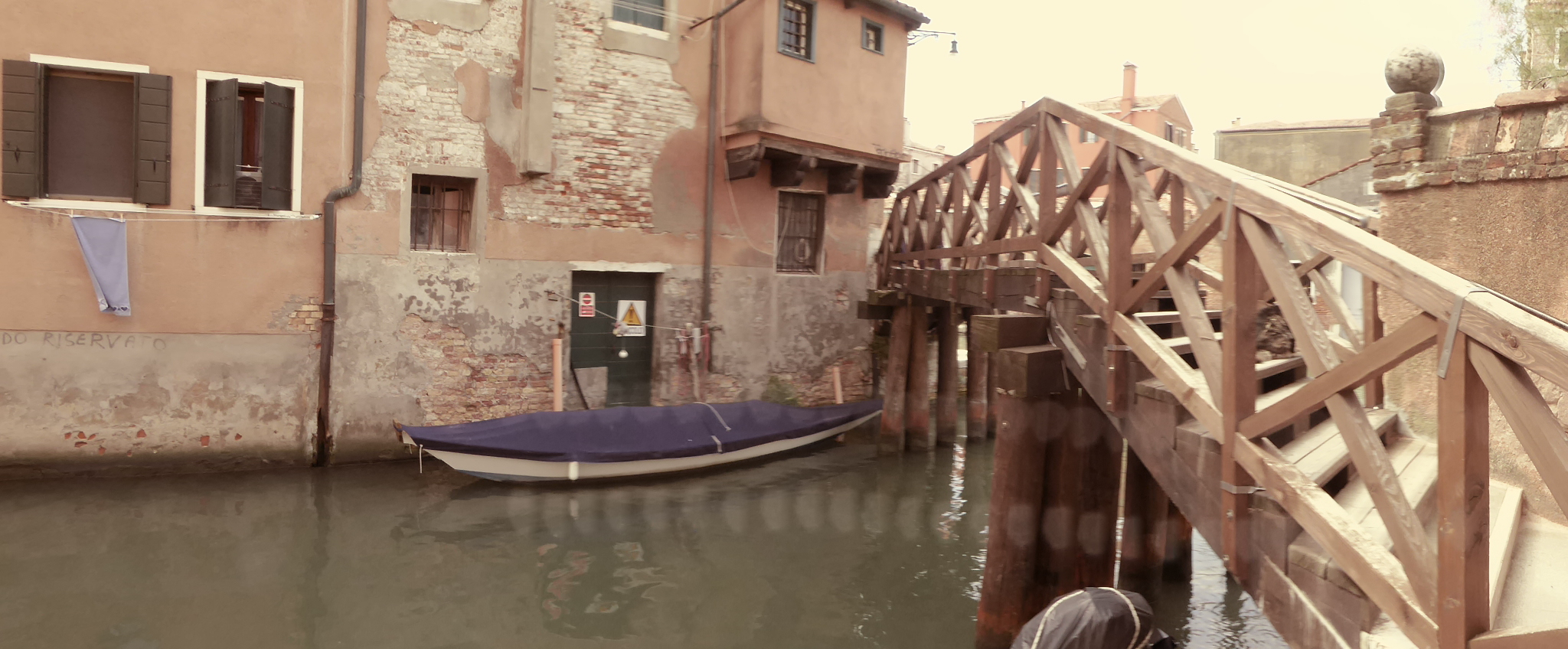
Ponte dei Muti
Rio dei Muti

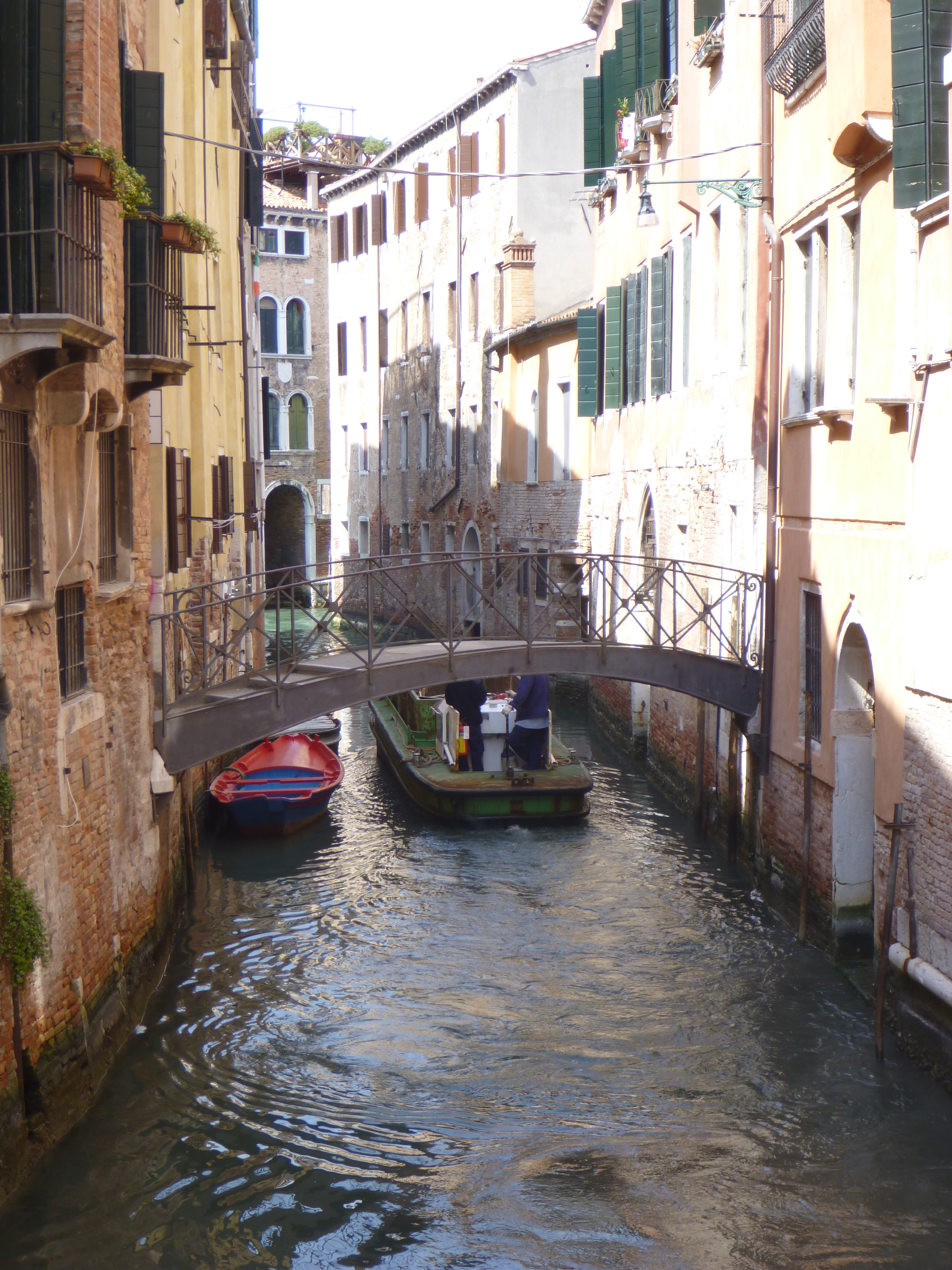
Ponte Noris
Rio de Ca'Widmann

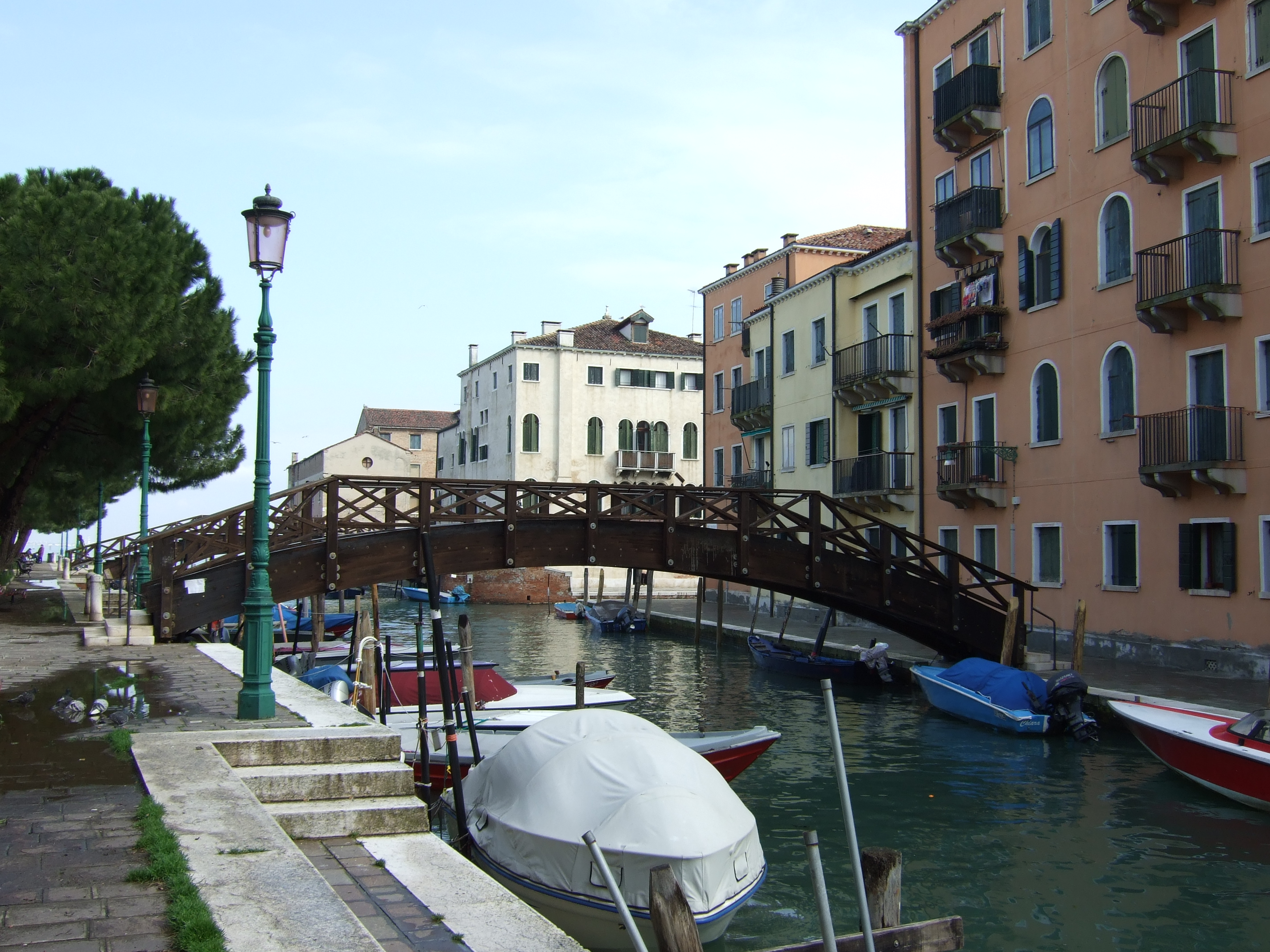
Ponte Novo
Rio de Ca'Moro

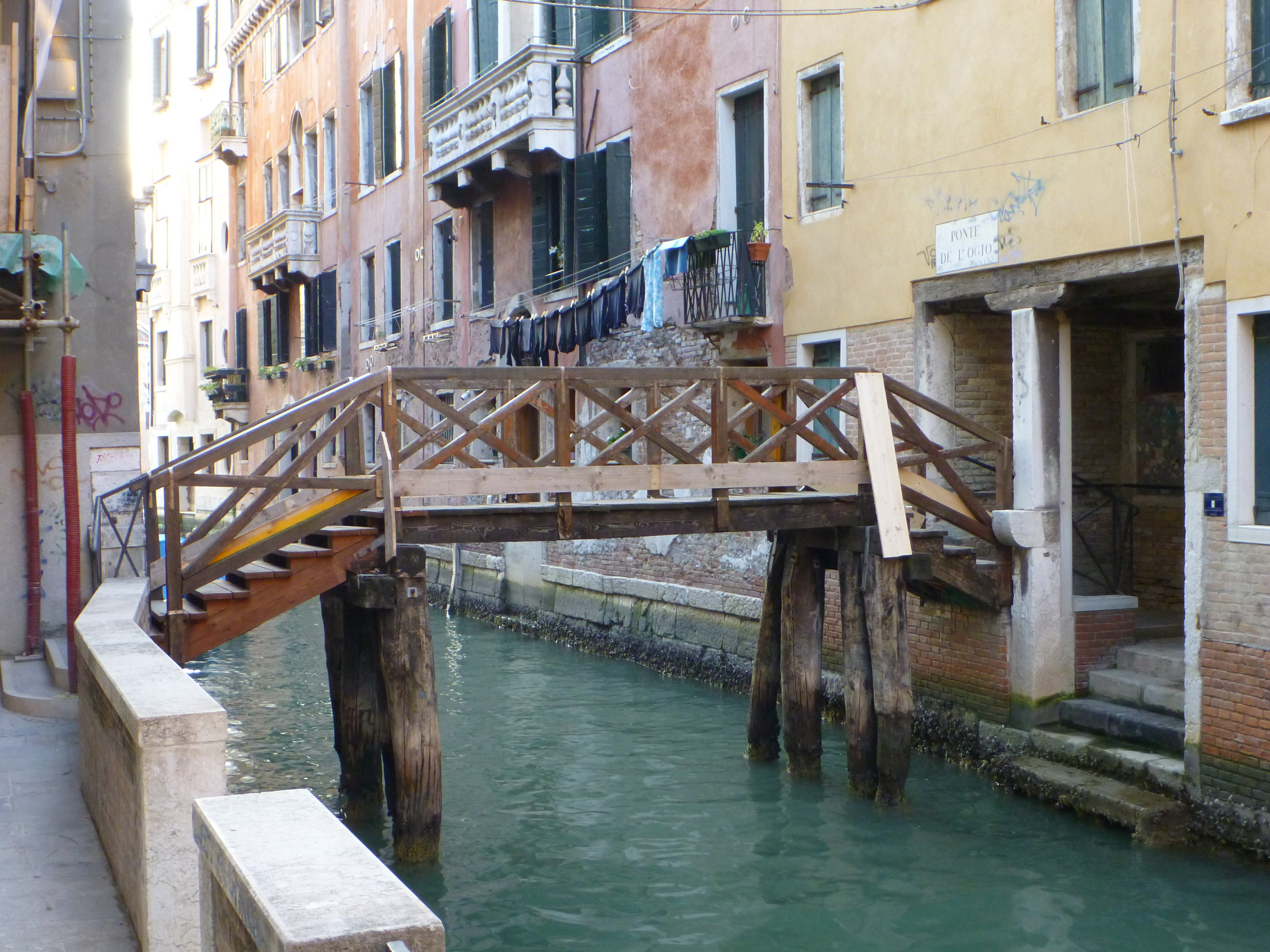
Ponte de l'Ogio
Rio de la Madalena

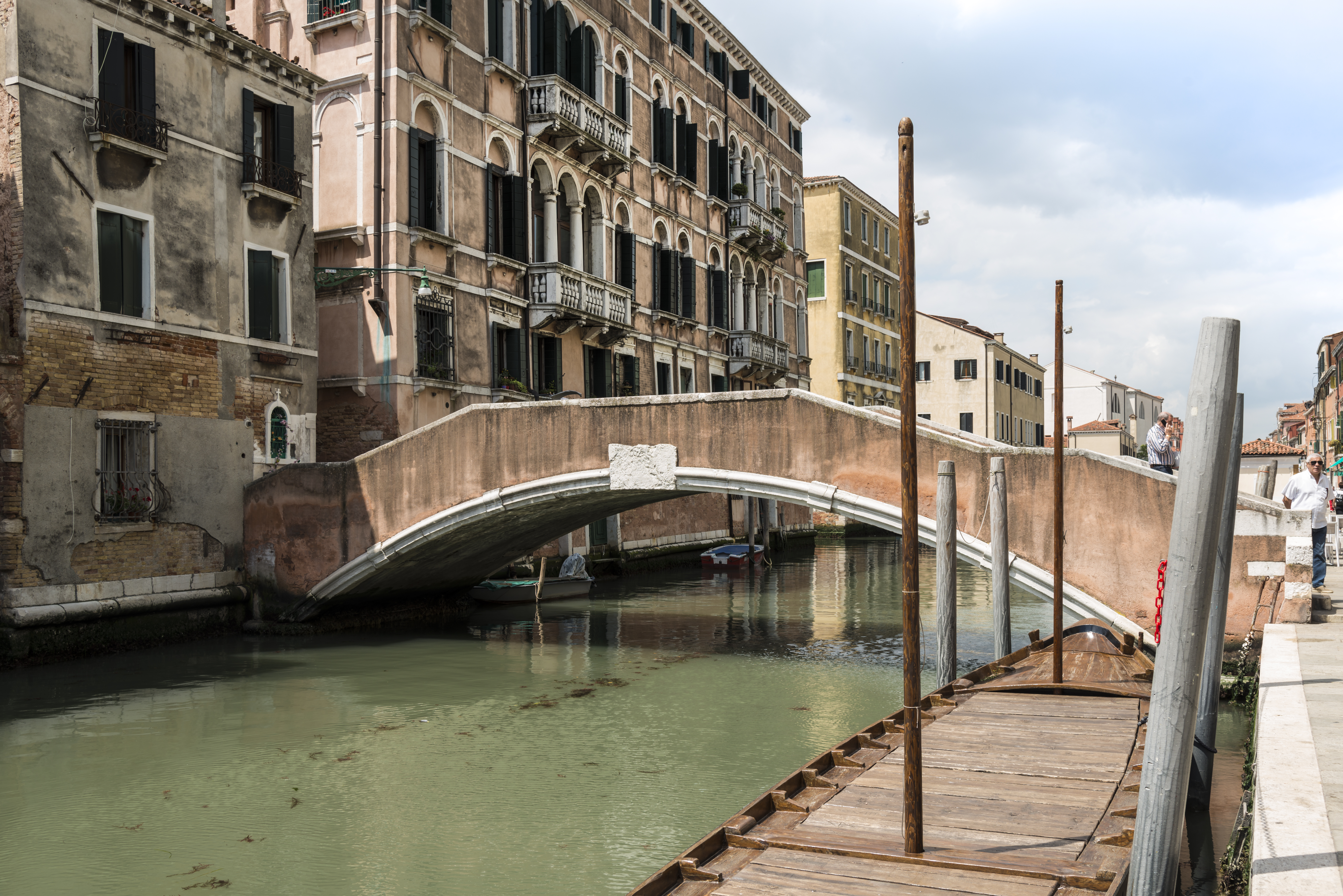
Ponte dei Ormesini
Rio de San Girolamo

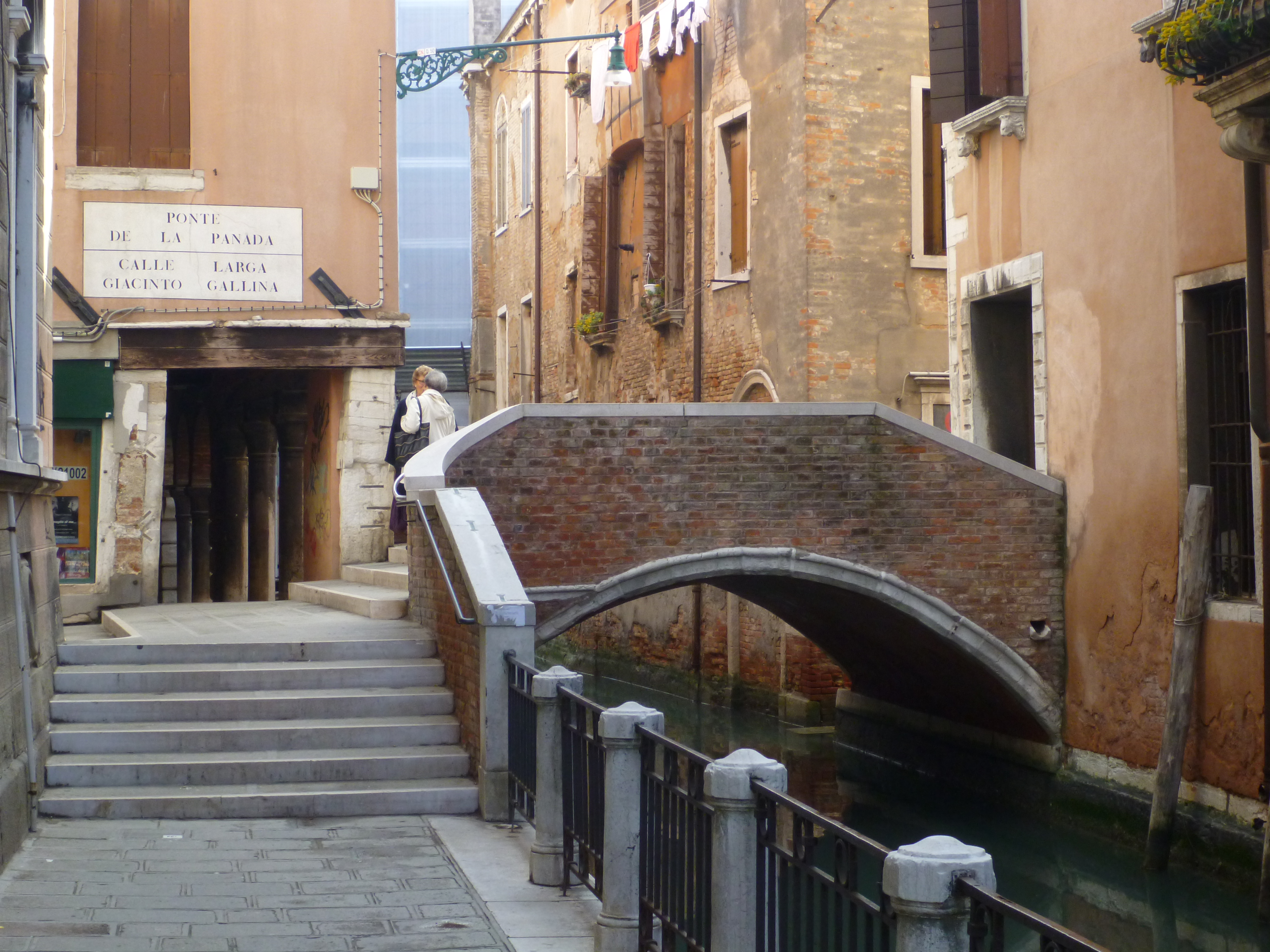
Ponte de la Panada
Rio de la Panada

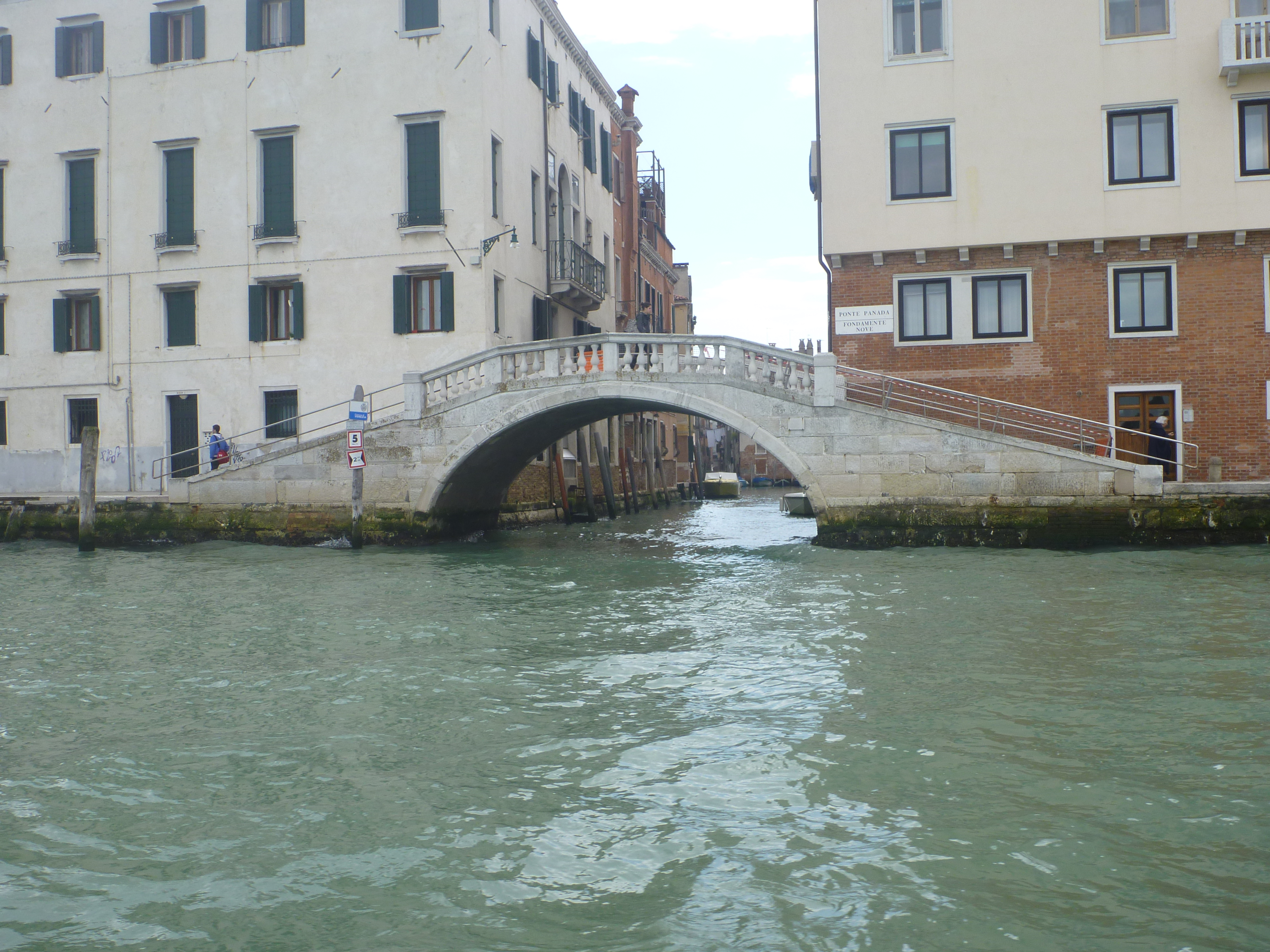
Ponte de la Panada alle Fondamente Nove
Rio de la Panada

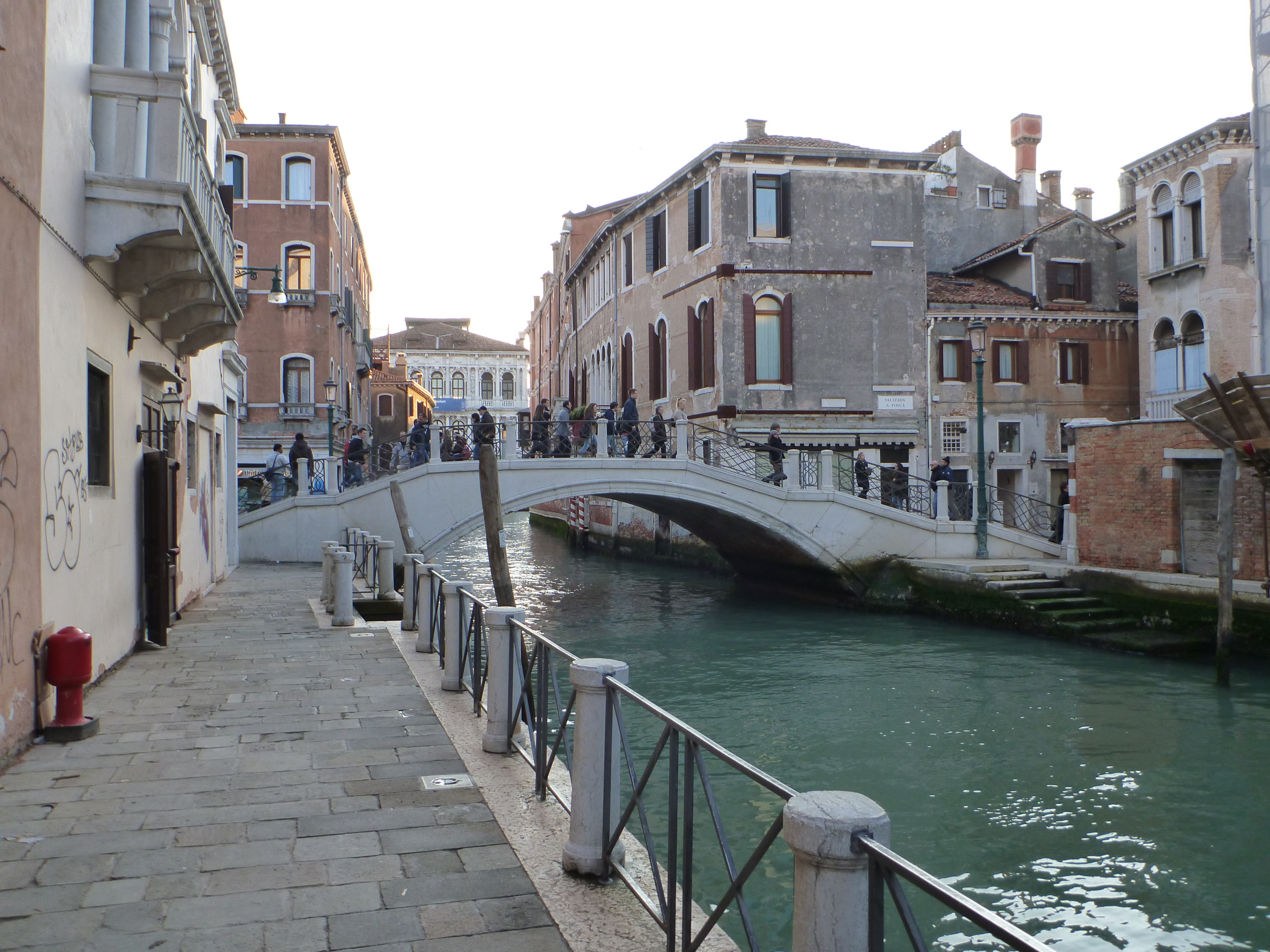
Ponte Pasqualigo ou Noal
Rio de Noal

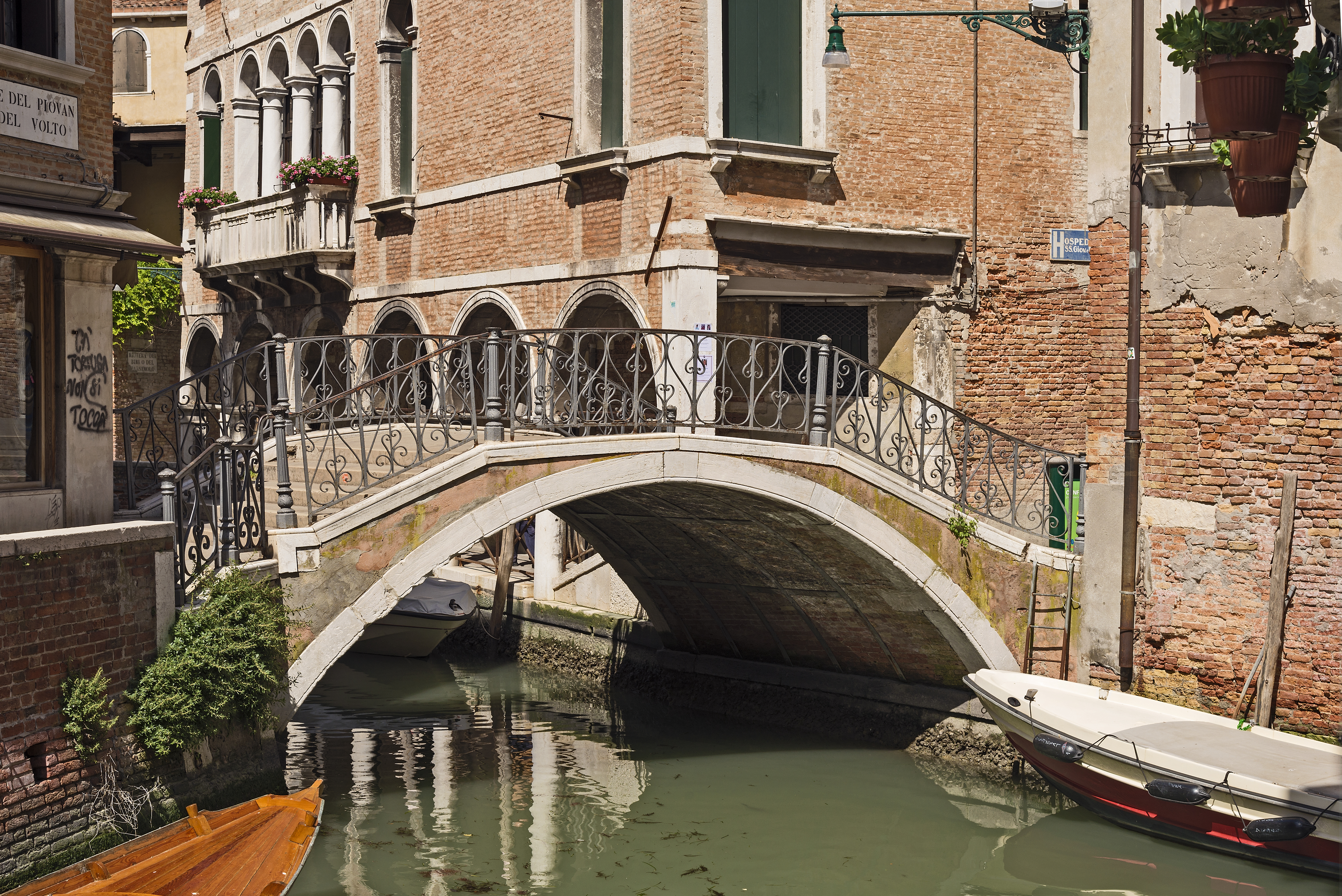
Ponte del Piovan/ d.Volto
Rio de Ca'Widmann

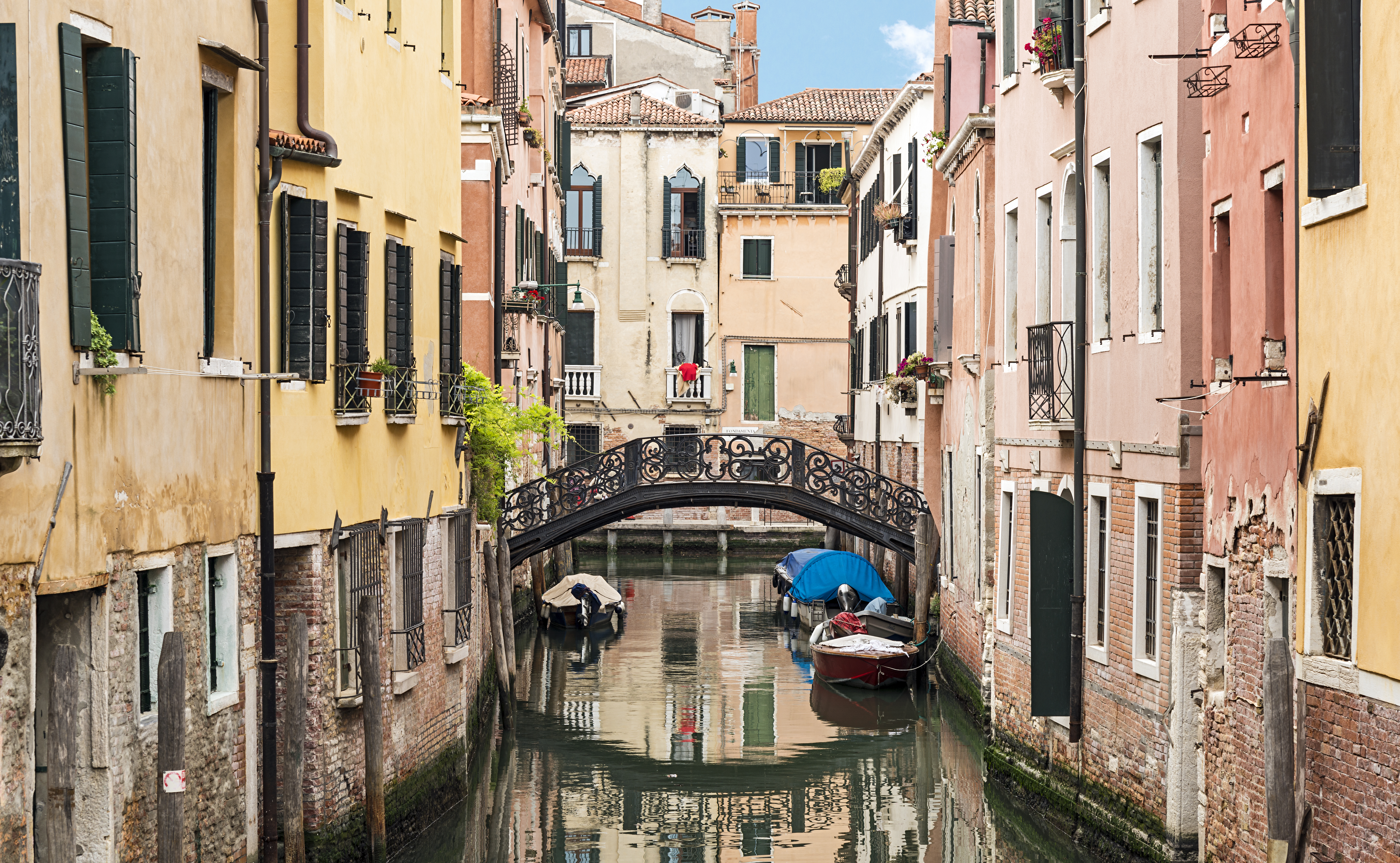
Ponte Priuli/delle Squero
Rio de Santa Sofia

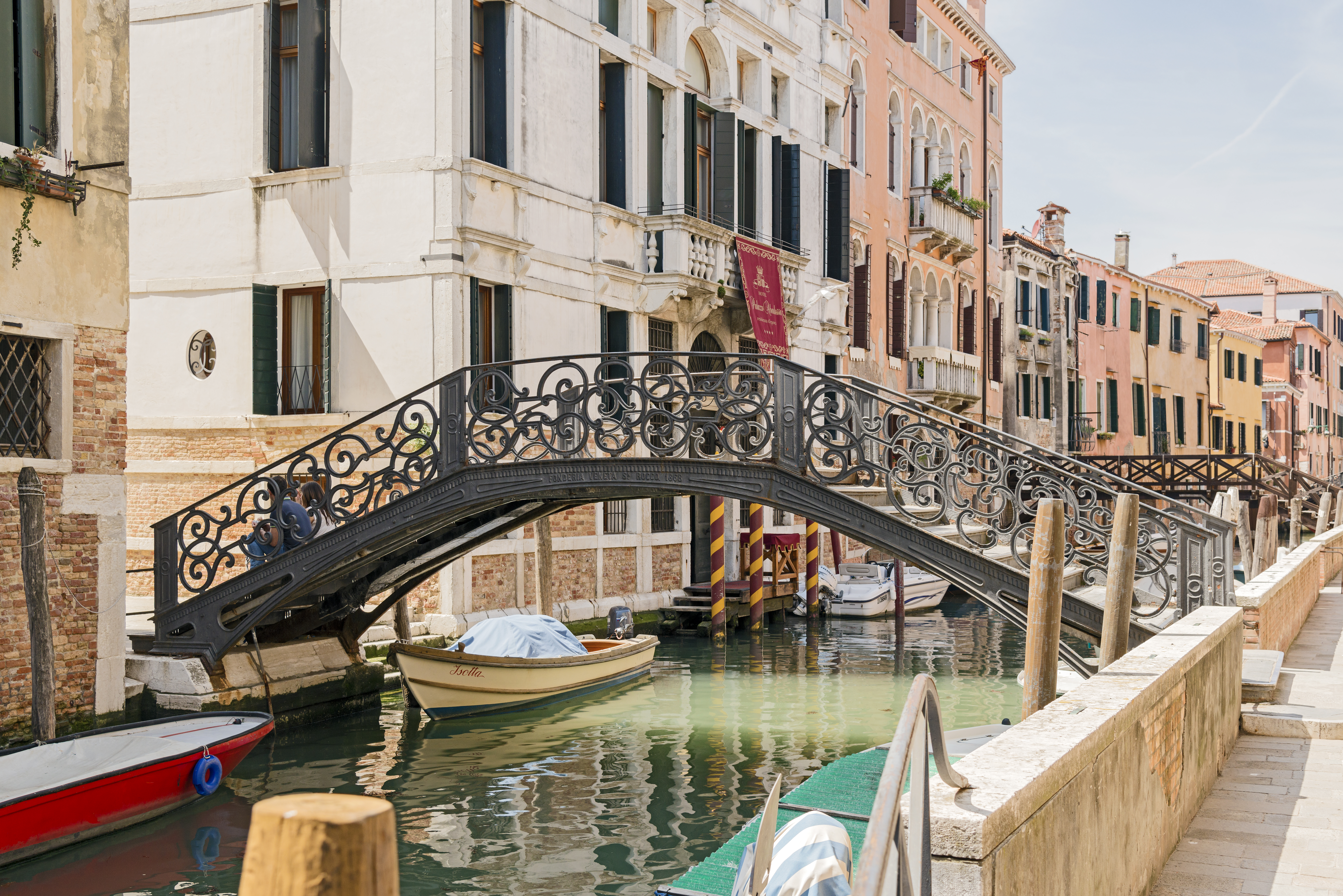
Ponte Priuli a Santa Sofia
Rio de Santa Sofia

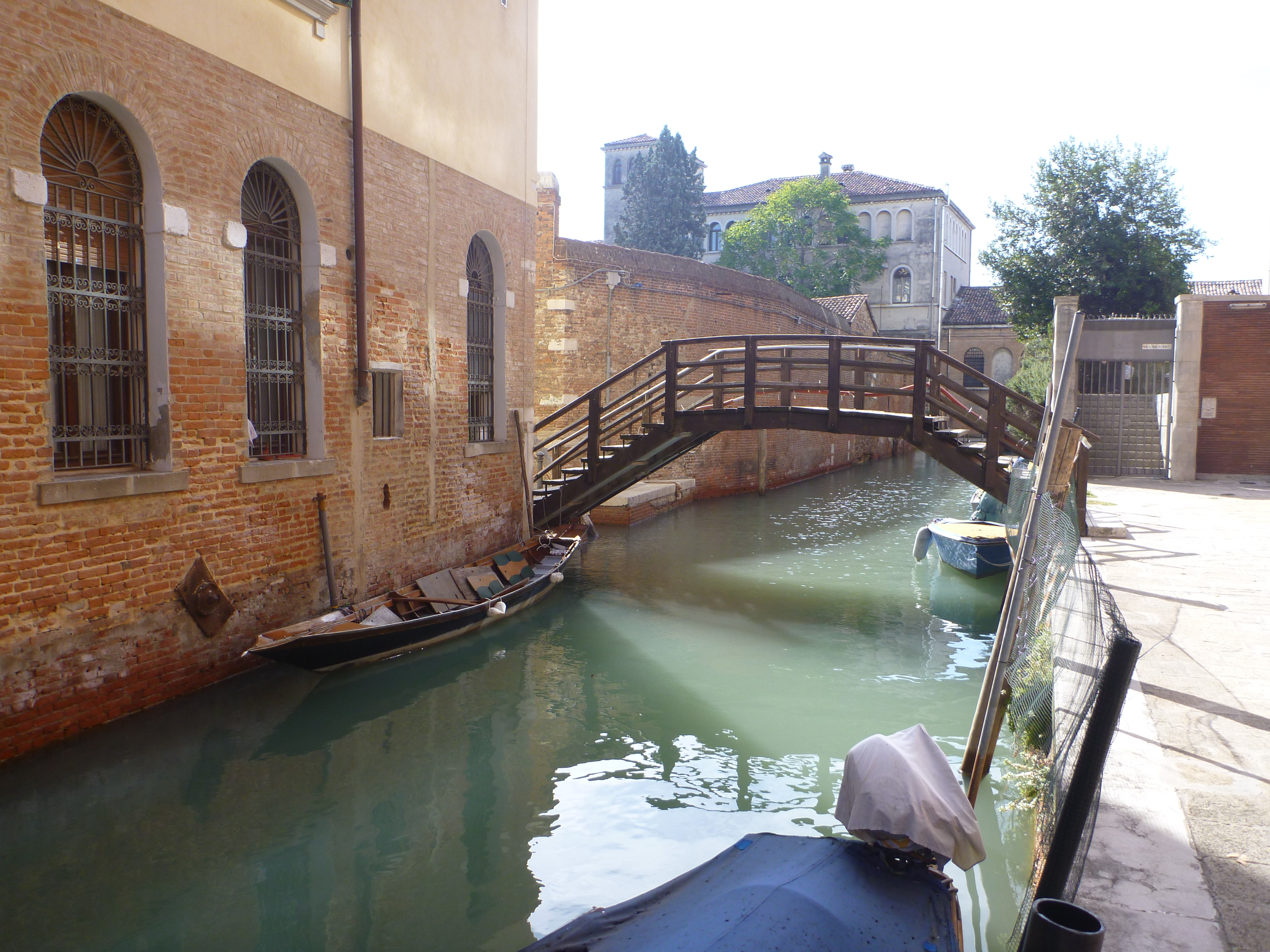
Ponte Priuli dei Cavaleti
Rio de la Crea

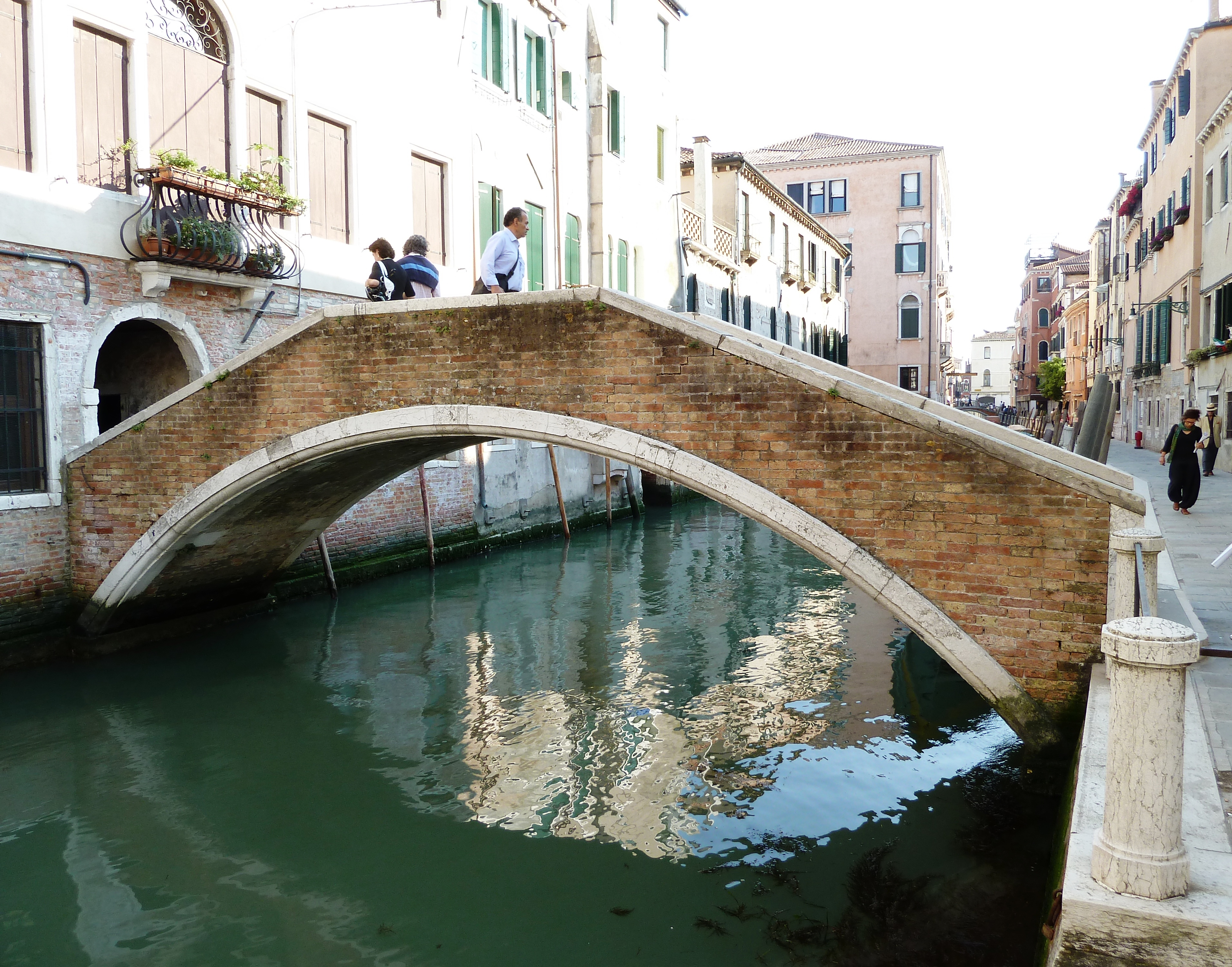
Ponte Racheta
Rio de San Felice

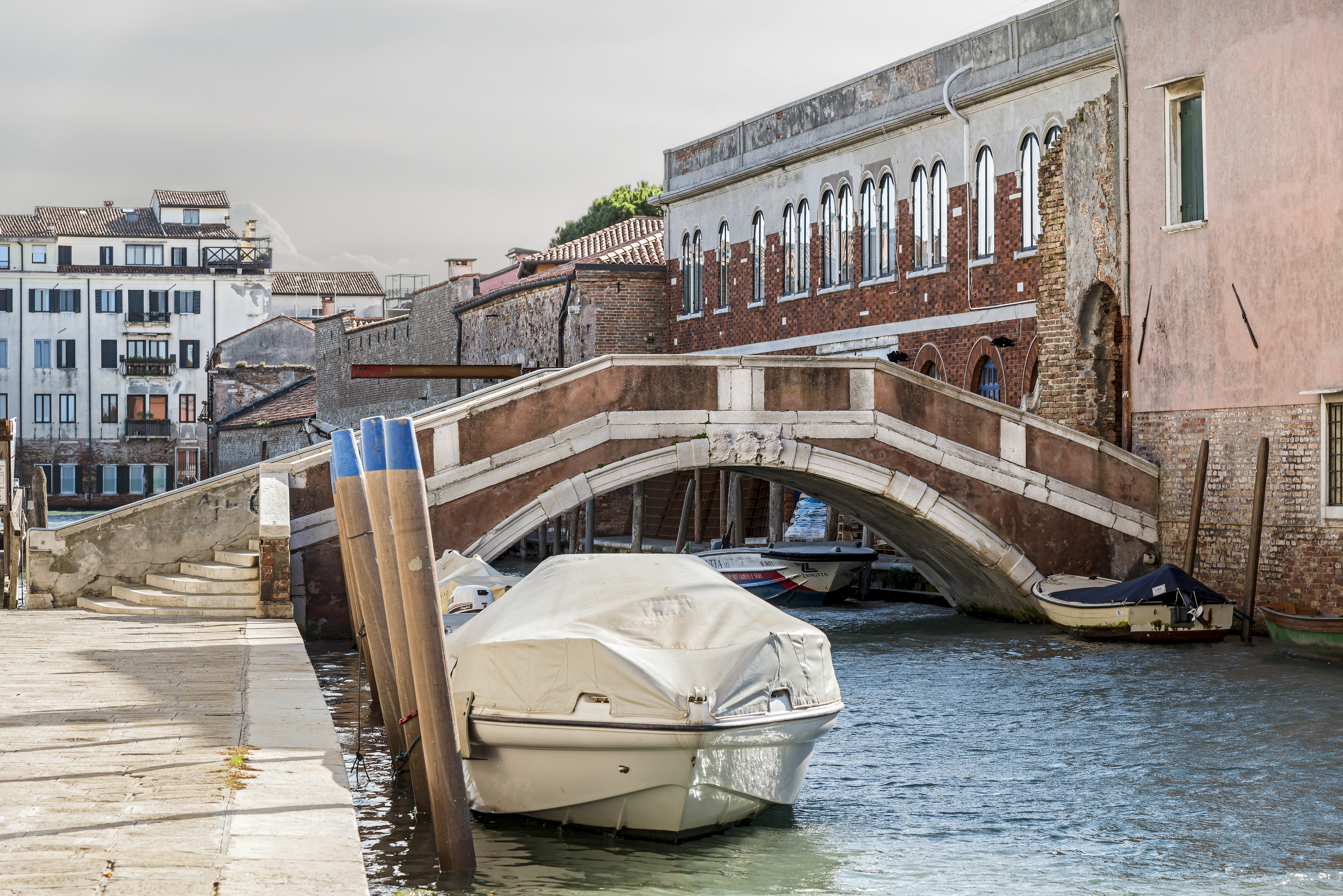
Ponte de la Sacca
Rio de la Madona de l'Orto

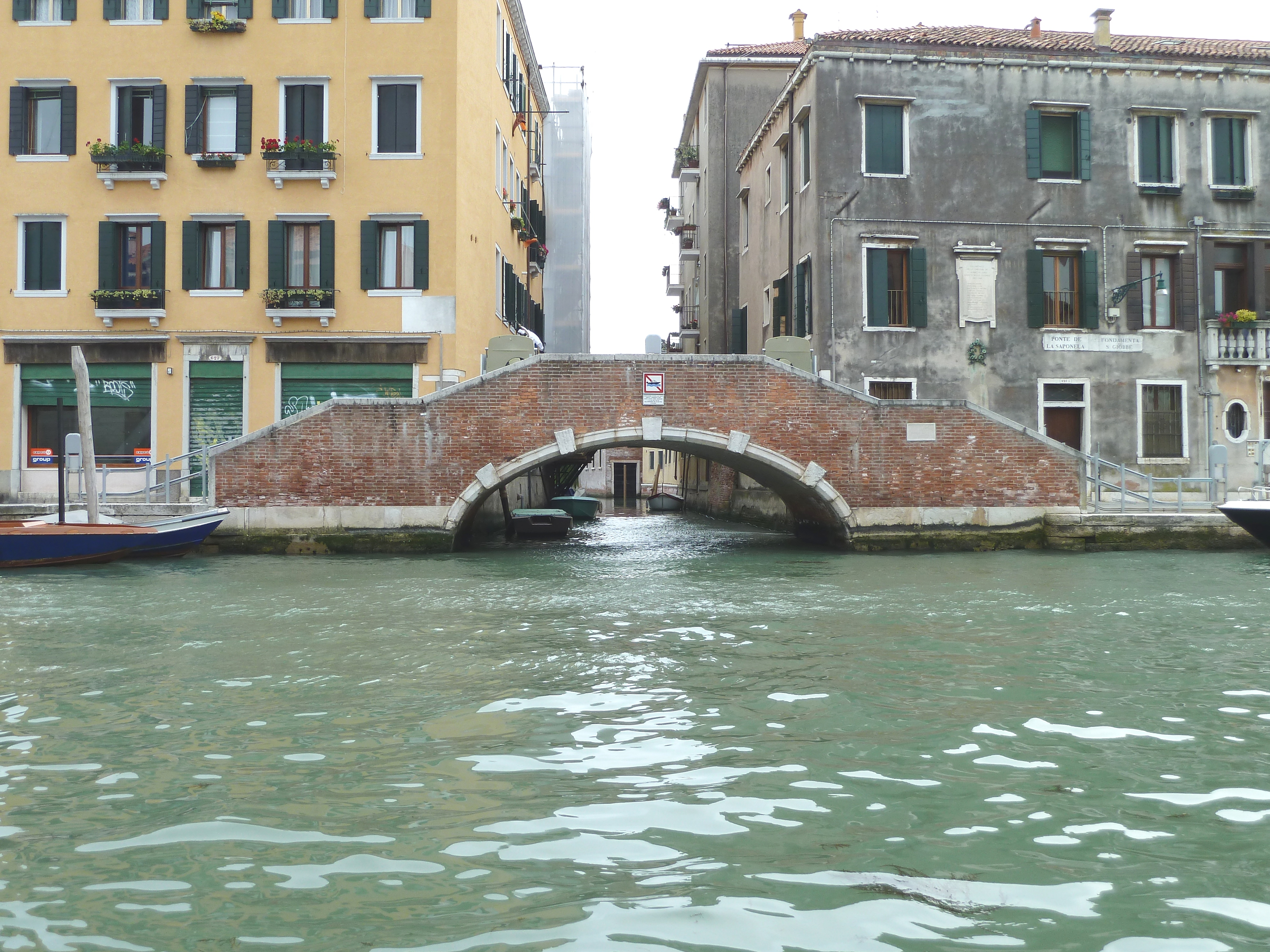
Ponte de la Saponella/Saponete
Rio de San Giobbe

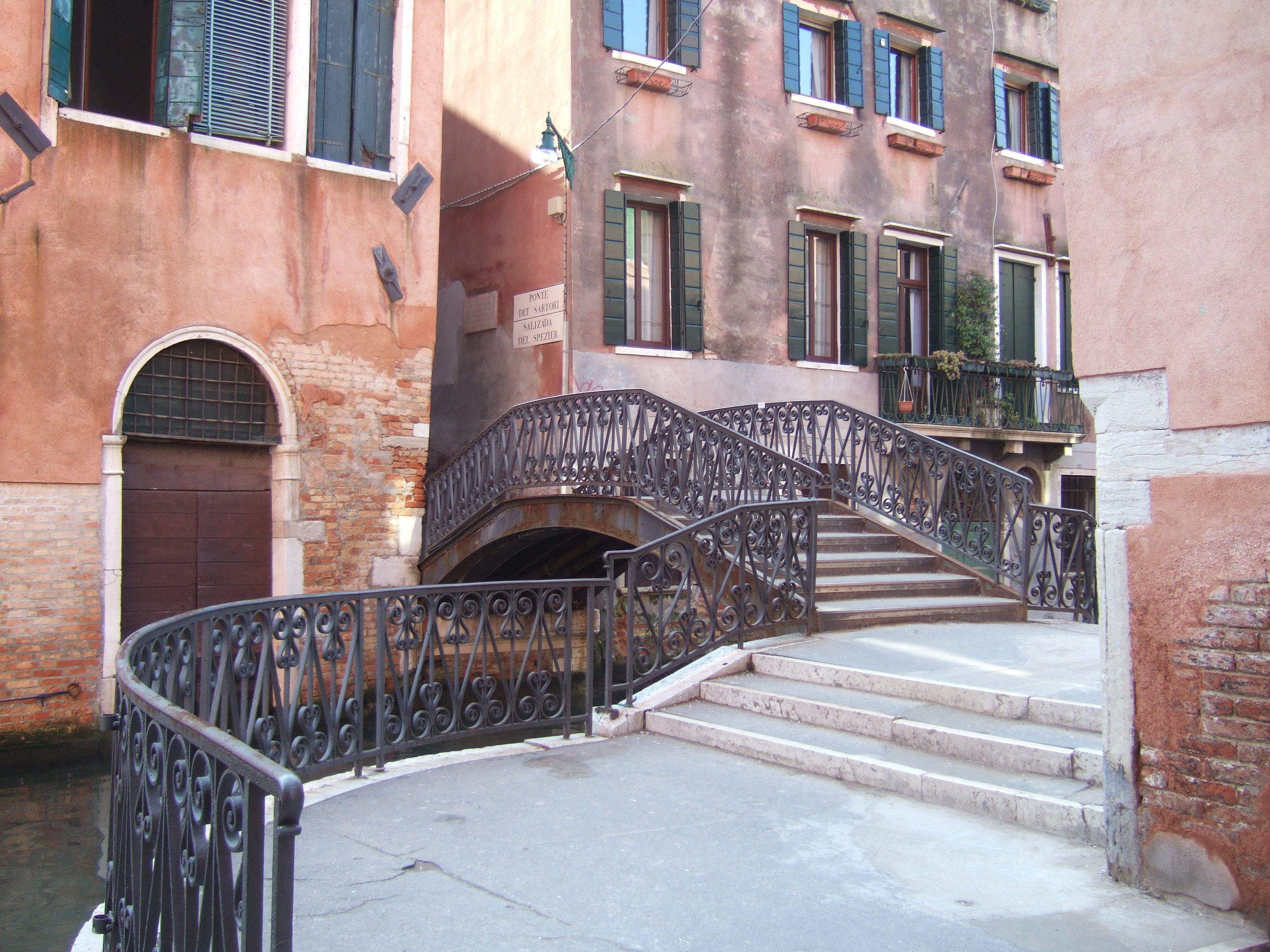
Ponte dei Sartori
Rio de Sant'Andrea

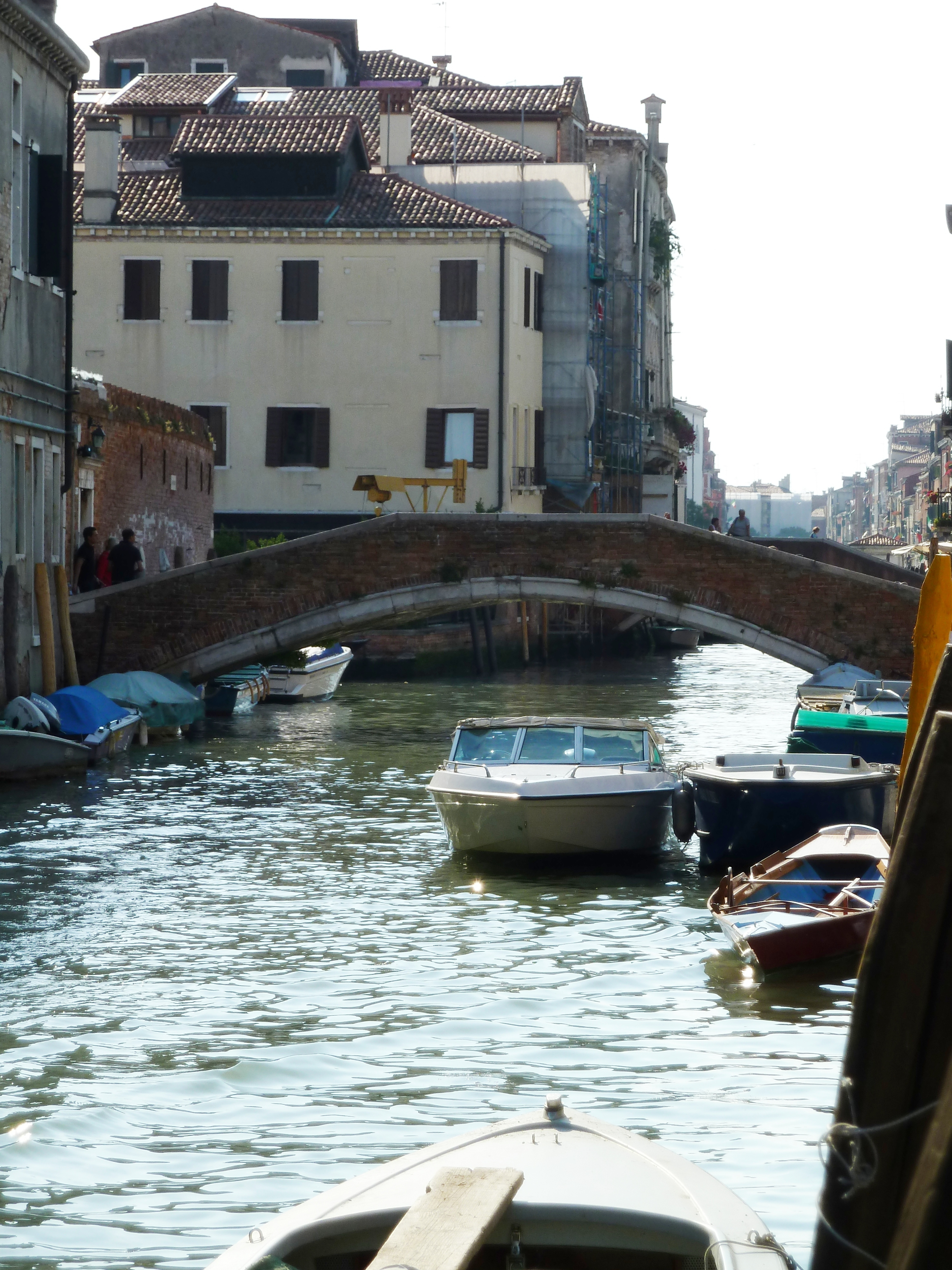
Ponte dei Servi/de Betania
Rio de la Misericordia

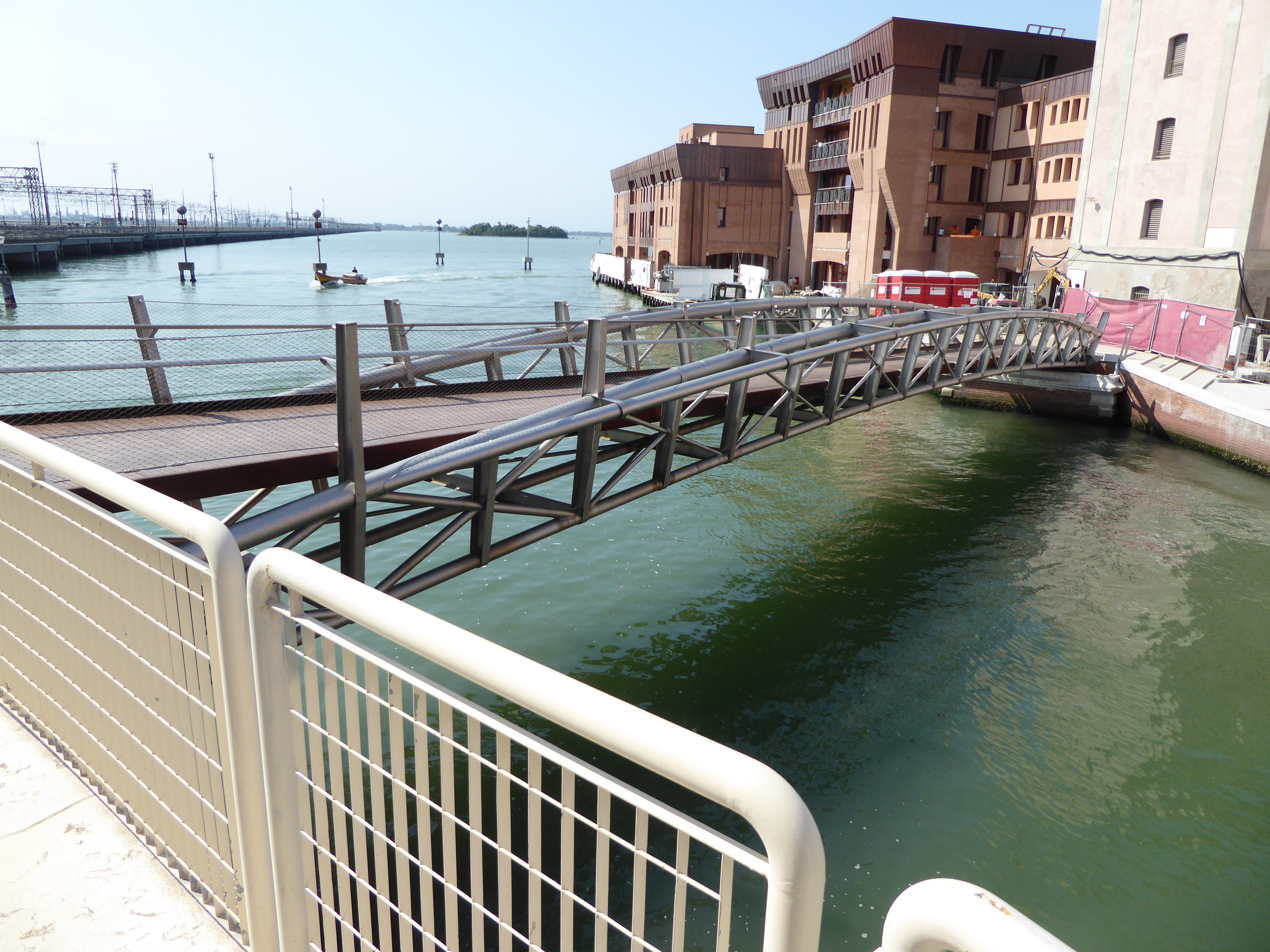
Ponte Valeria Solesin
Rio de la Crea

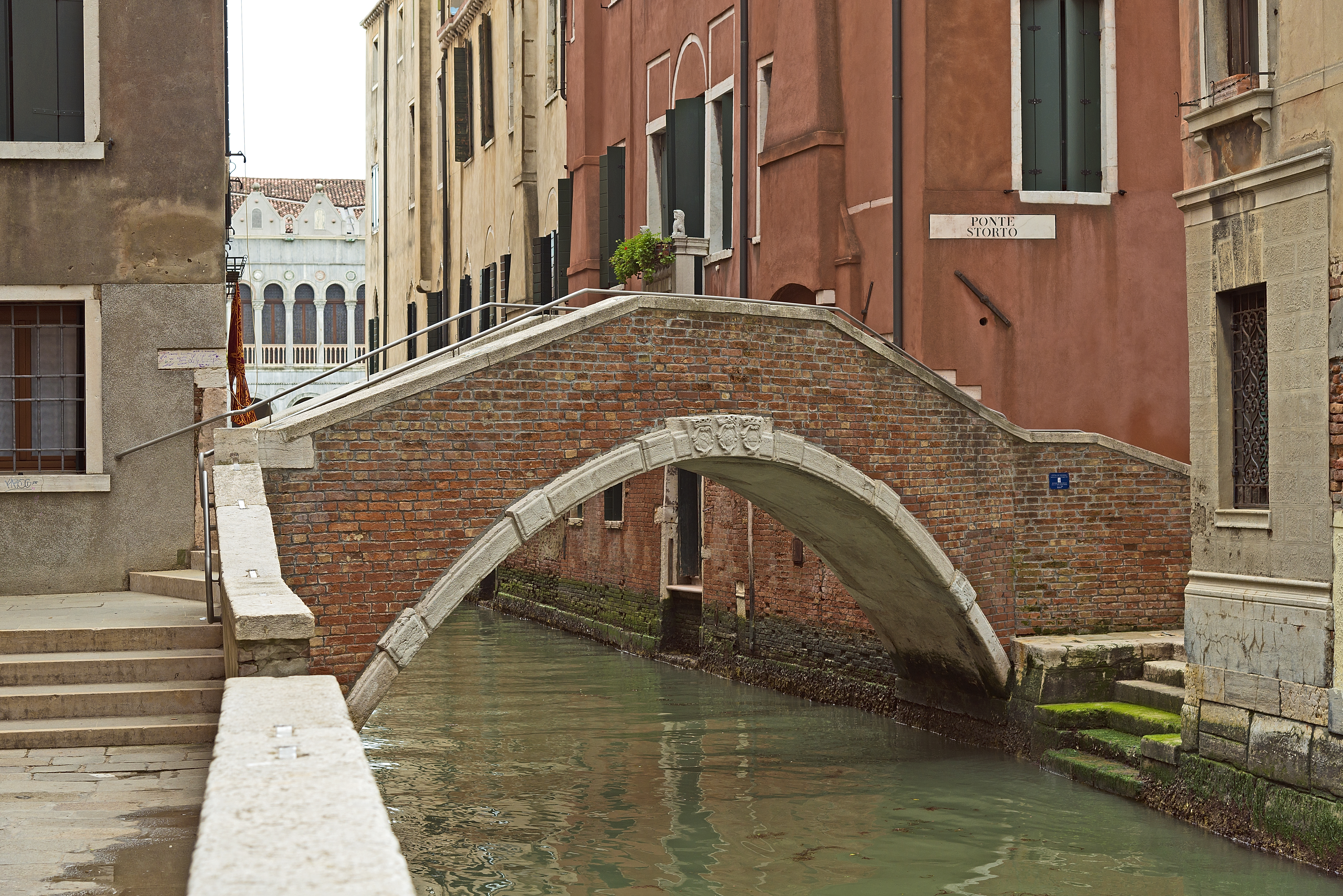
Ponte Storto
Rio de San Marcuola

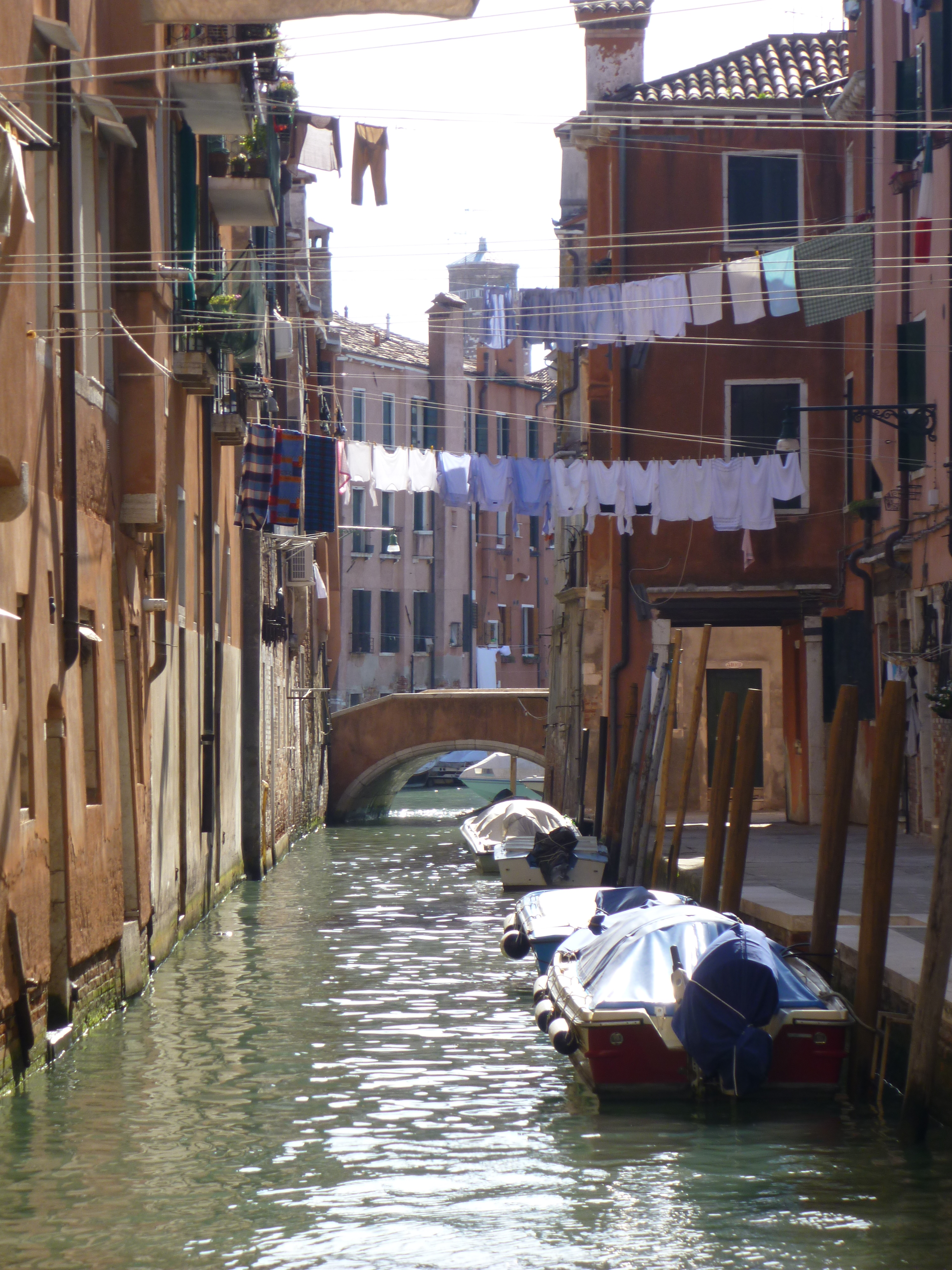
Ponte de le Torete
Rio de le Torete

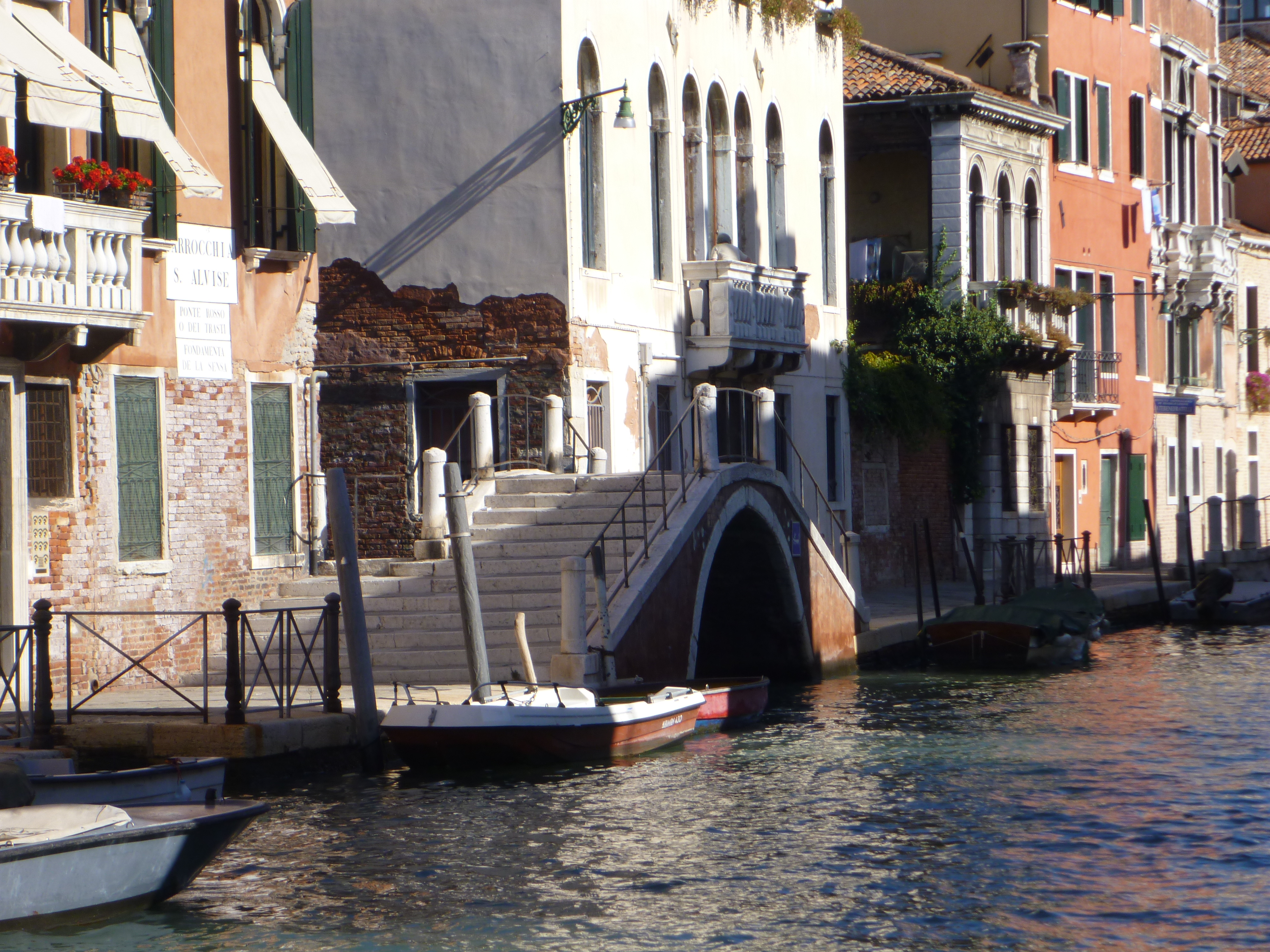
Ponte dei Trasti ou Rosso
Rio dei Trasti

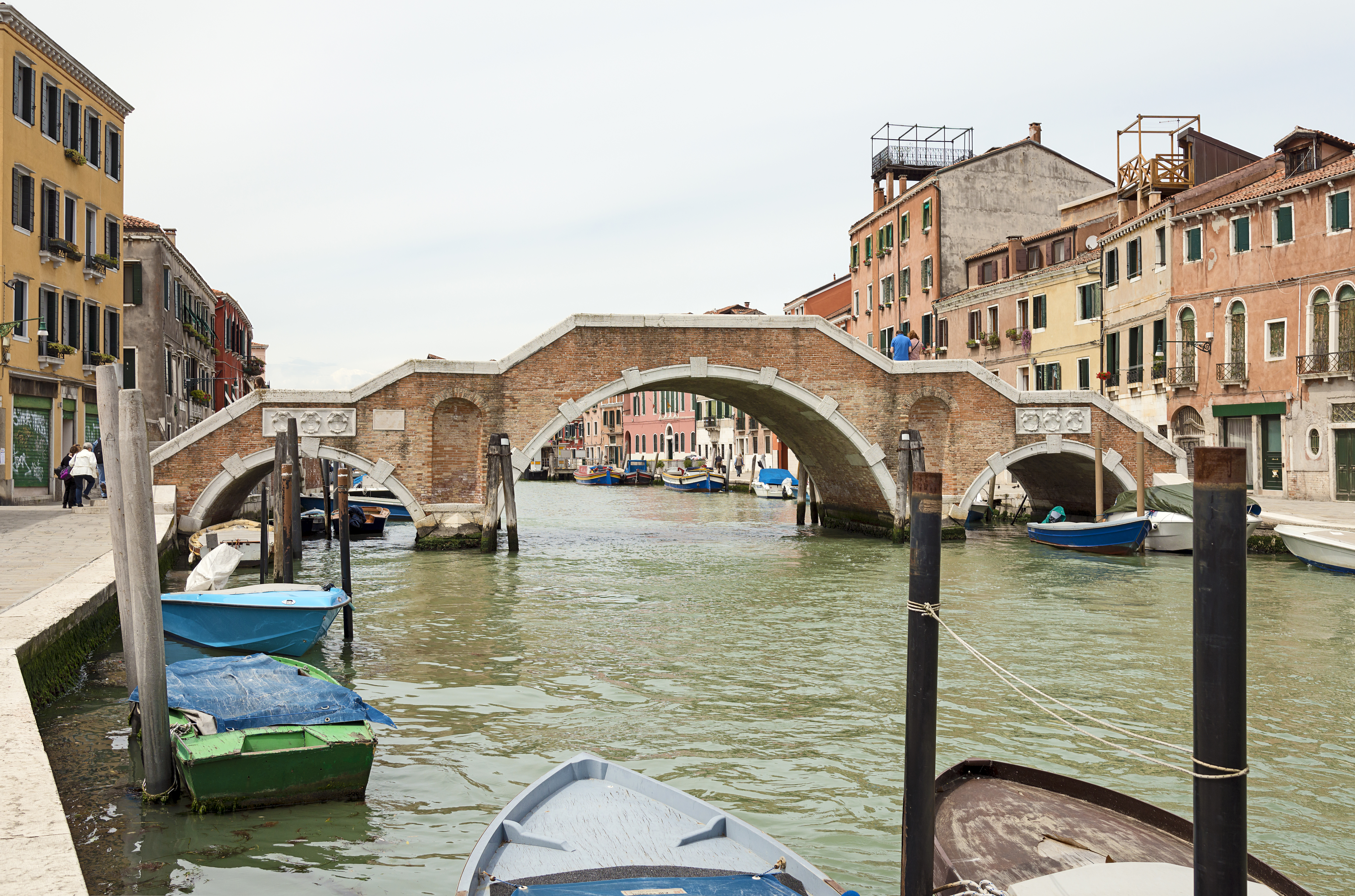
Ponte dei Tre Archi
Canal de Cannaregio

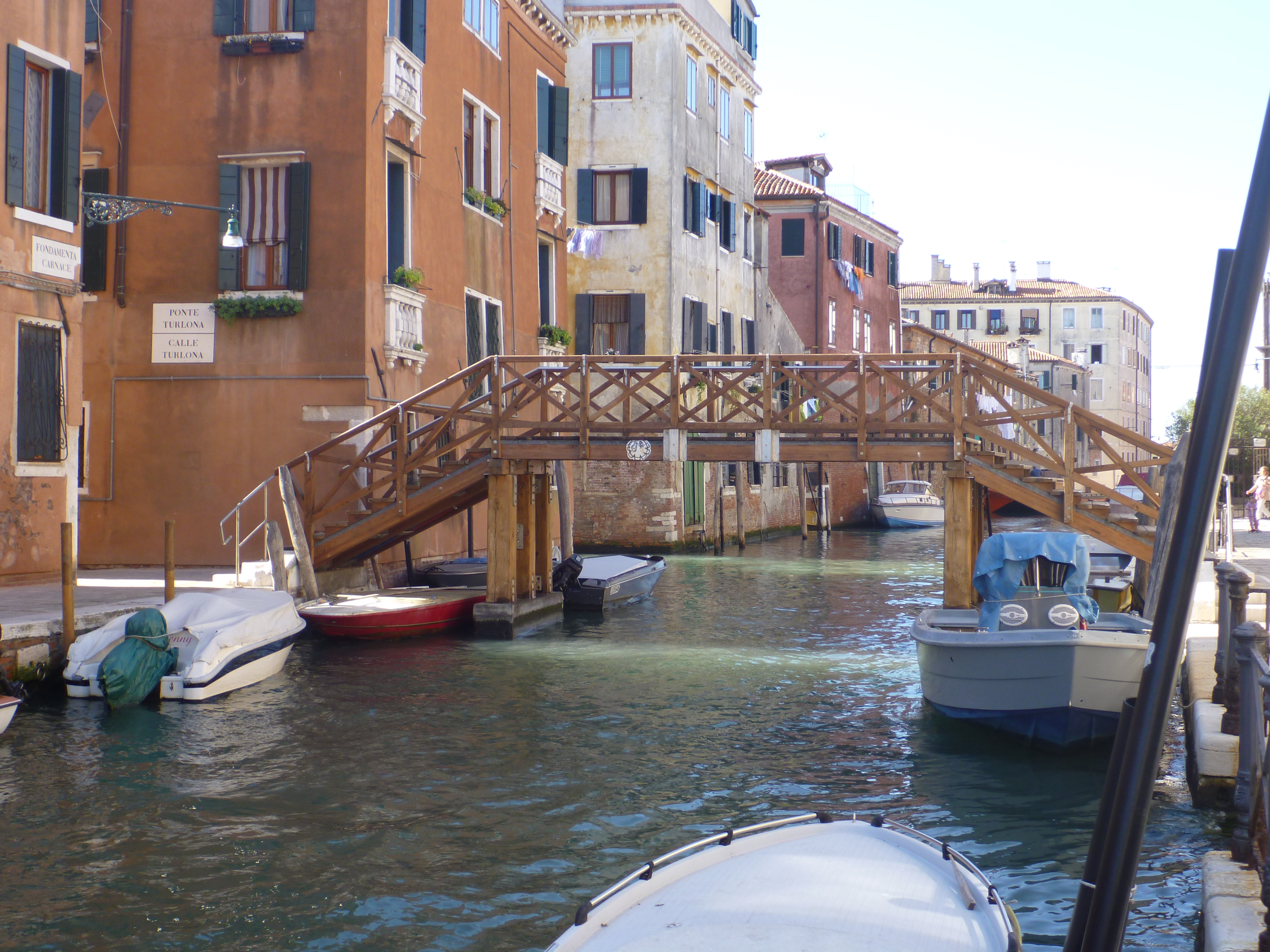
Ponte Turlona
Rio de la Sensa

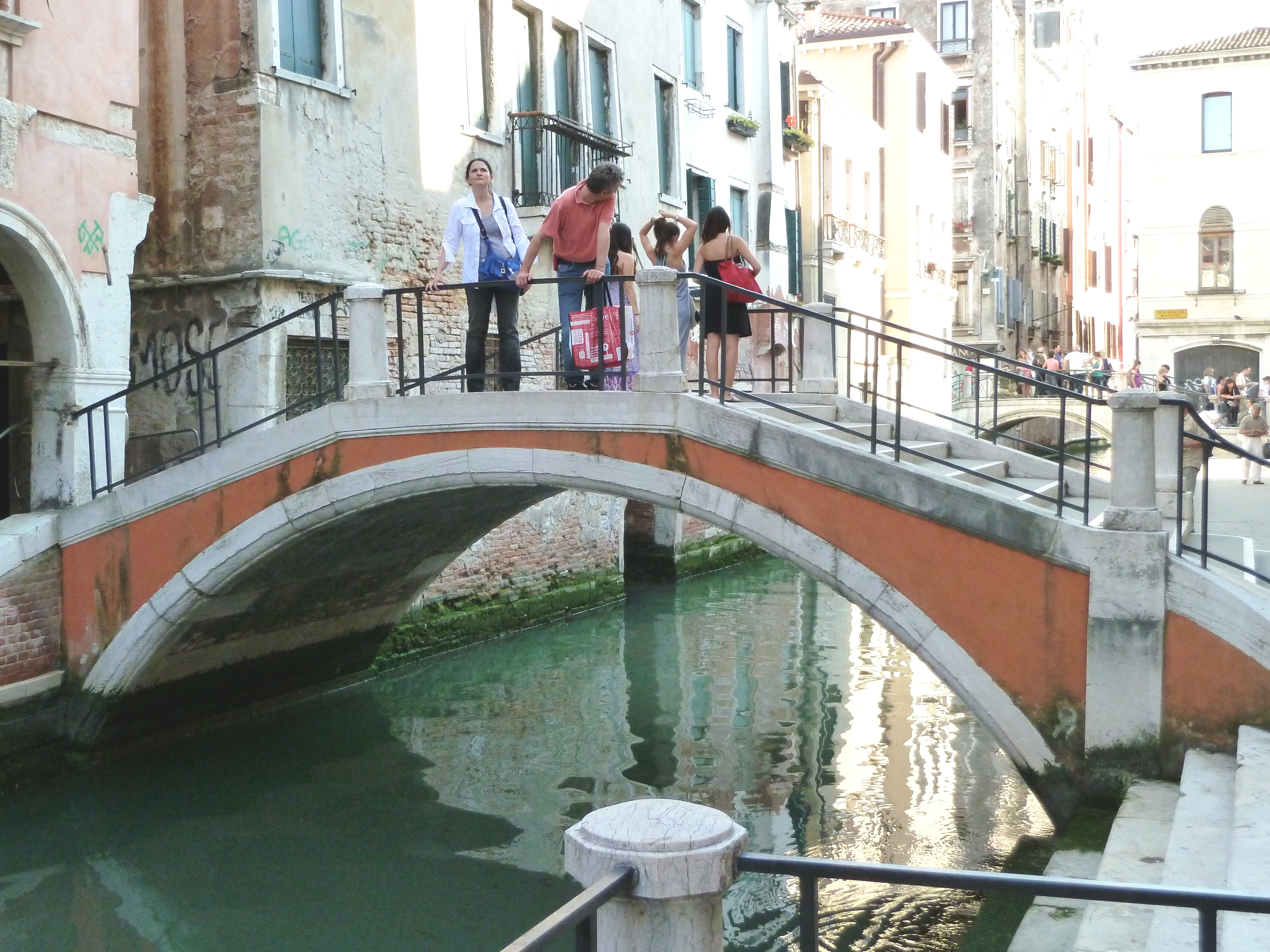
Ponte Ubaldo Belli
Rio de San Felice

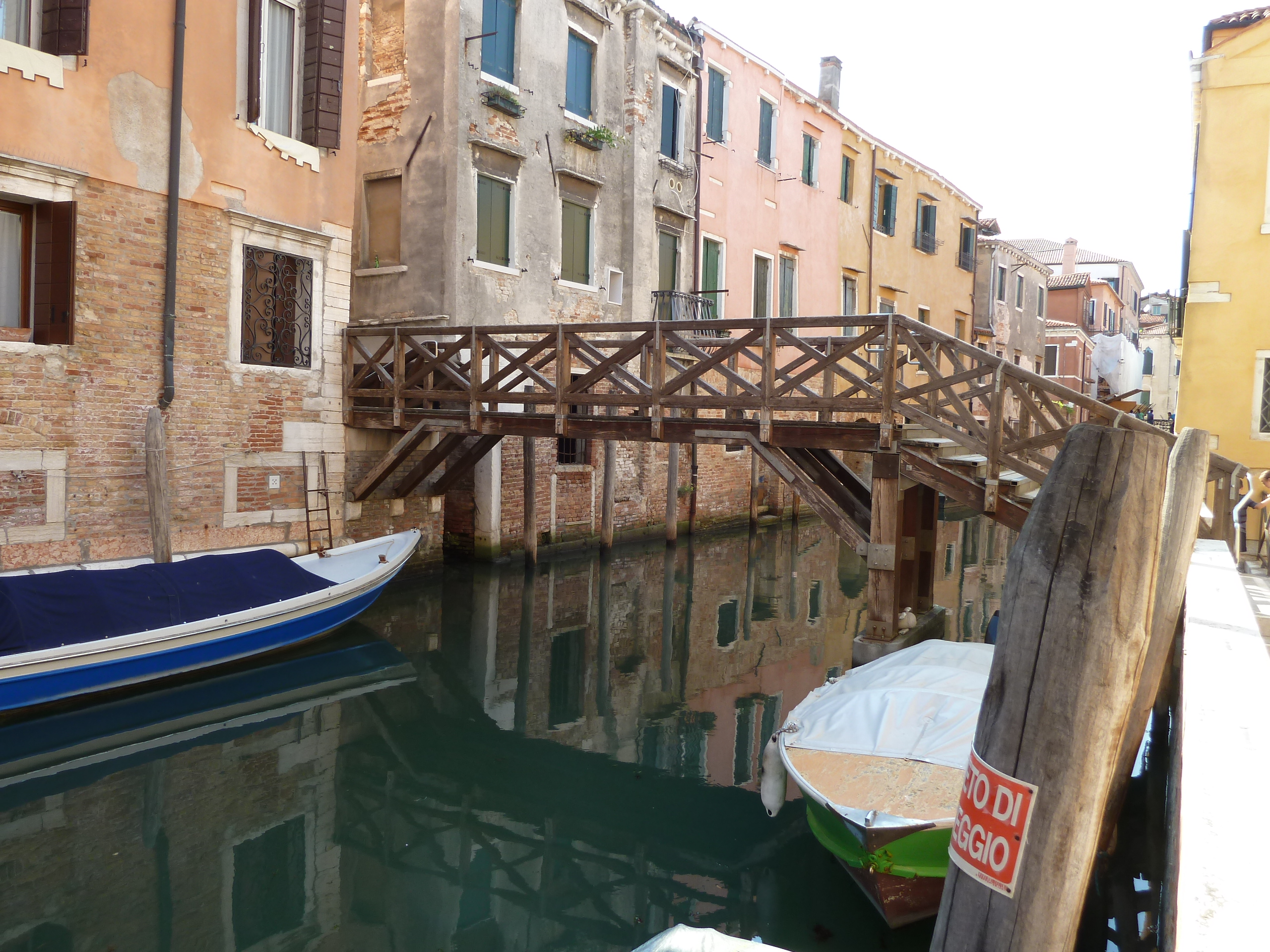
Ponte de le Vele
Rio de Santa Sofia

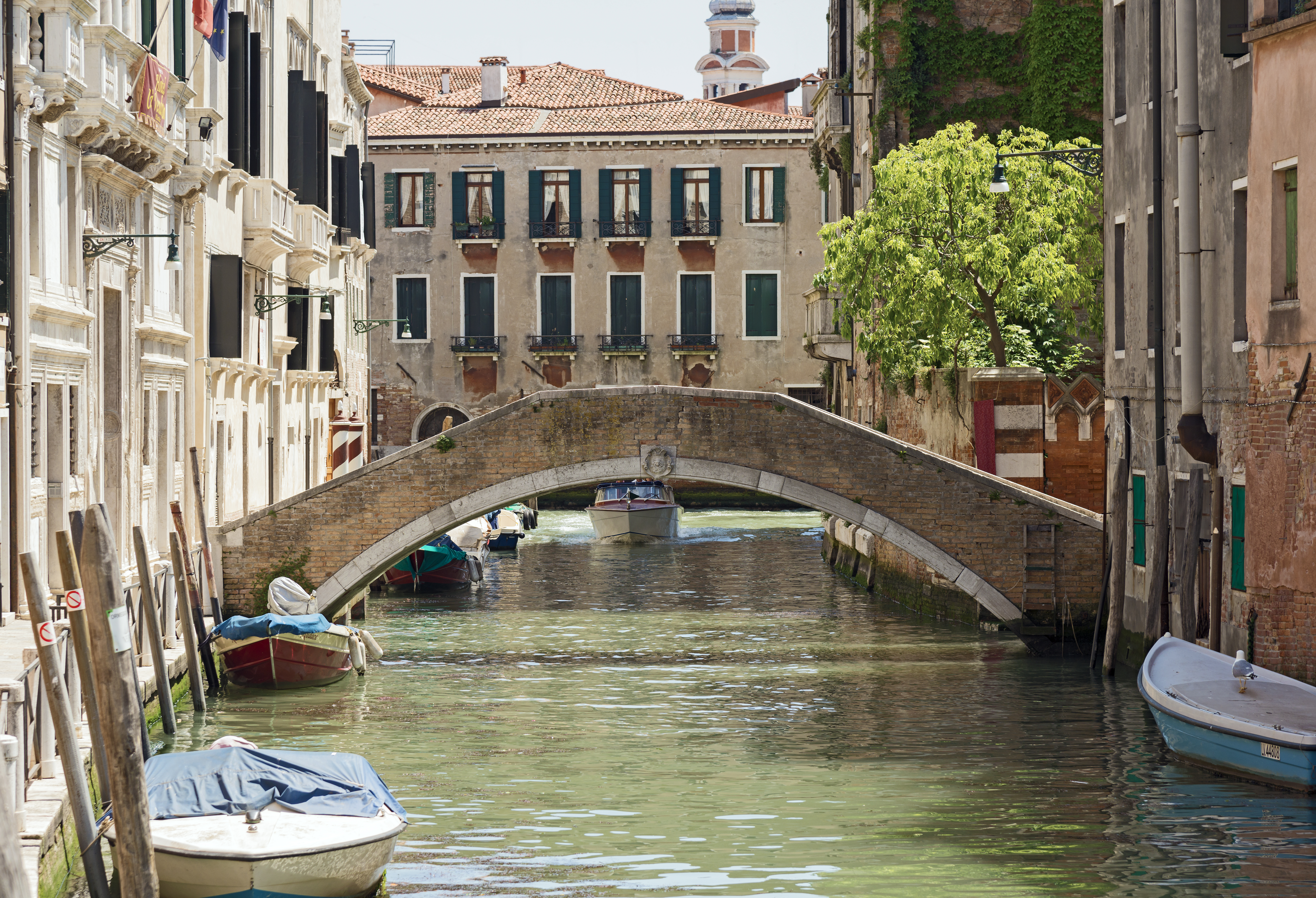
Ponte Vendramin
Rio de Santa Fosca

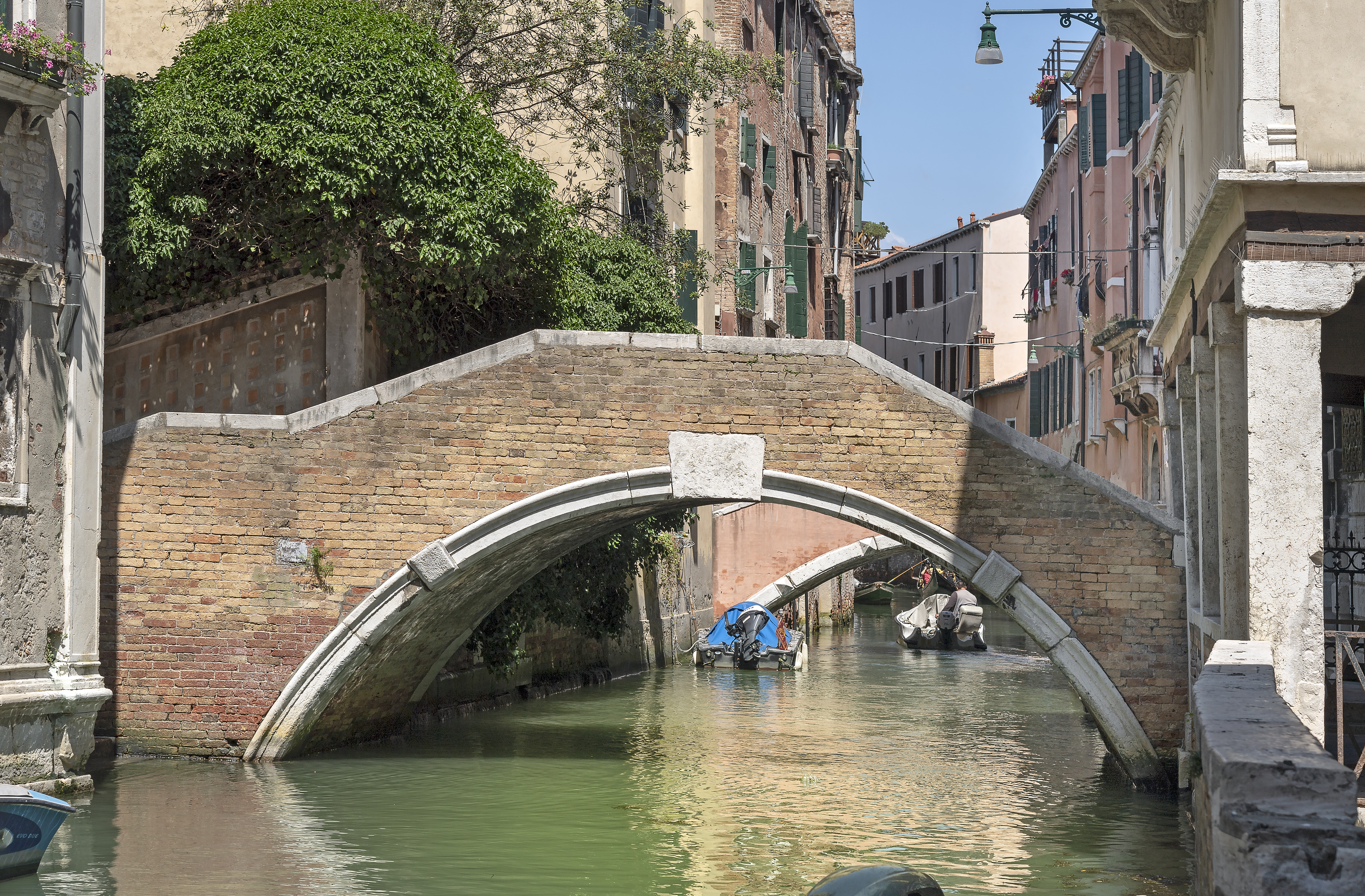
Ponte Widman
Rio de Ca'Widmann

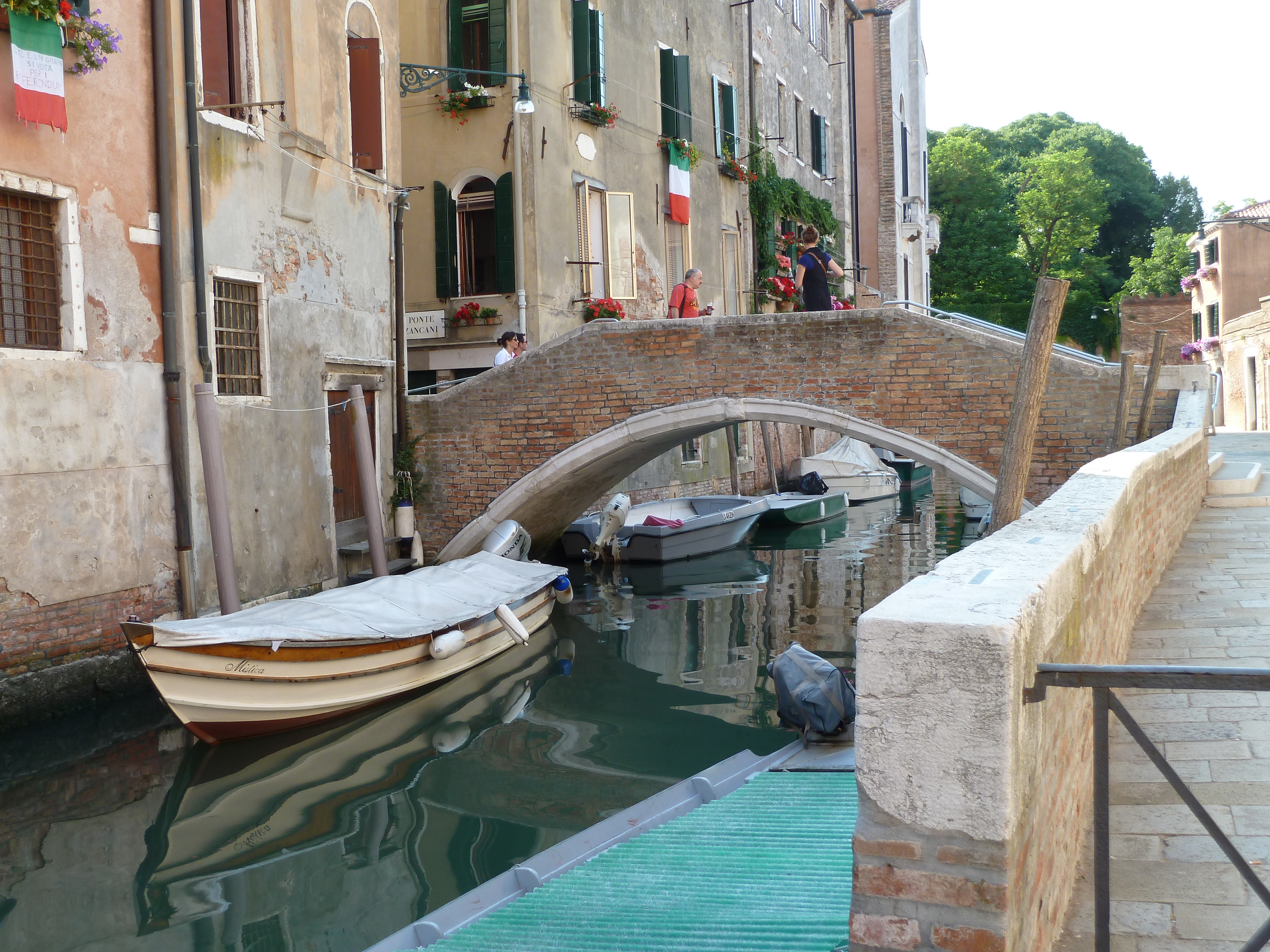
Ponte Zancan
Rio del Trapolin
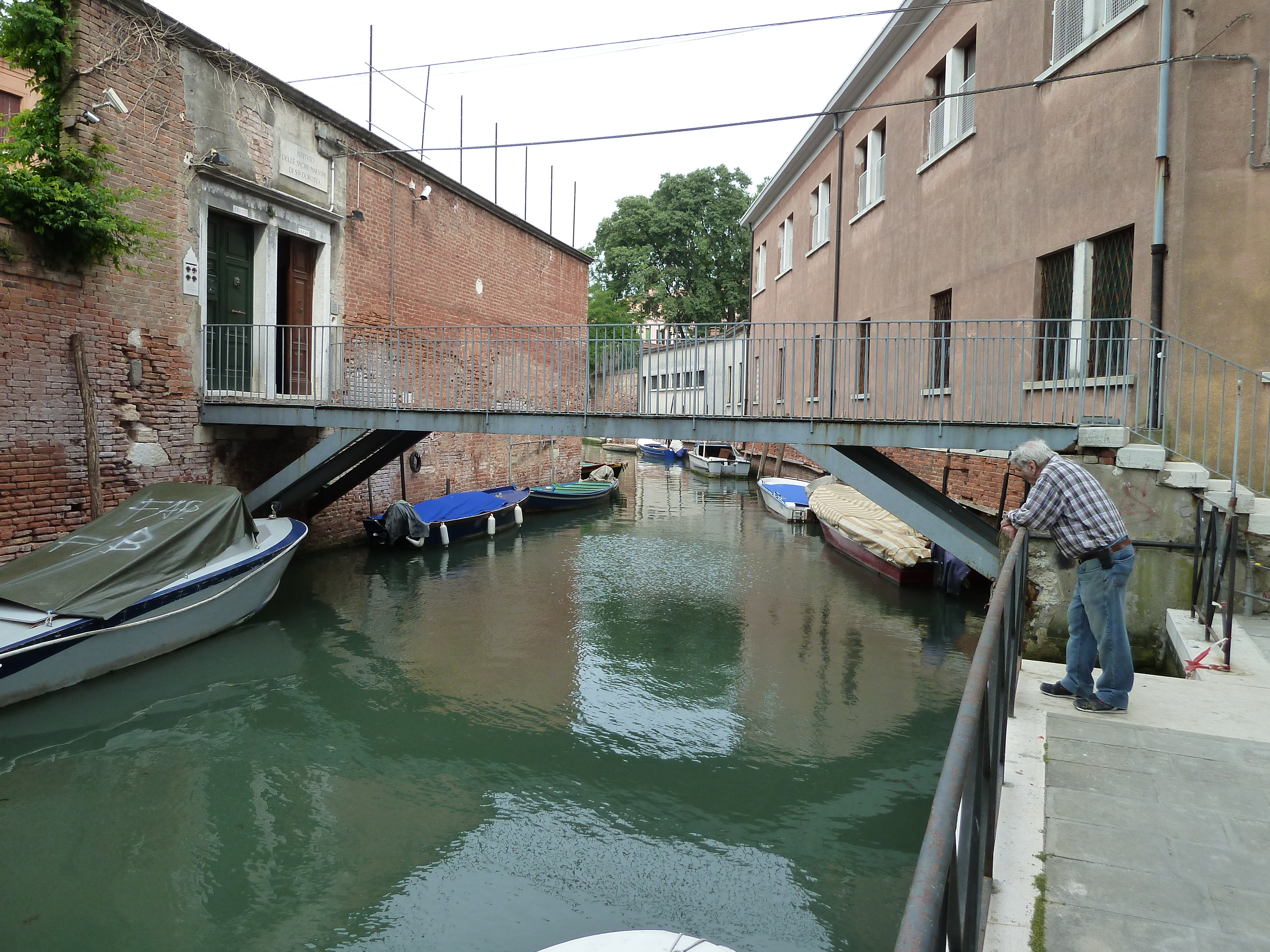
Private bridge Ponte Chioverete
(No. 1104/C e D), Rio del Batelo

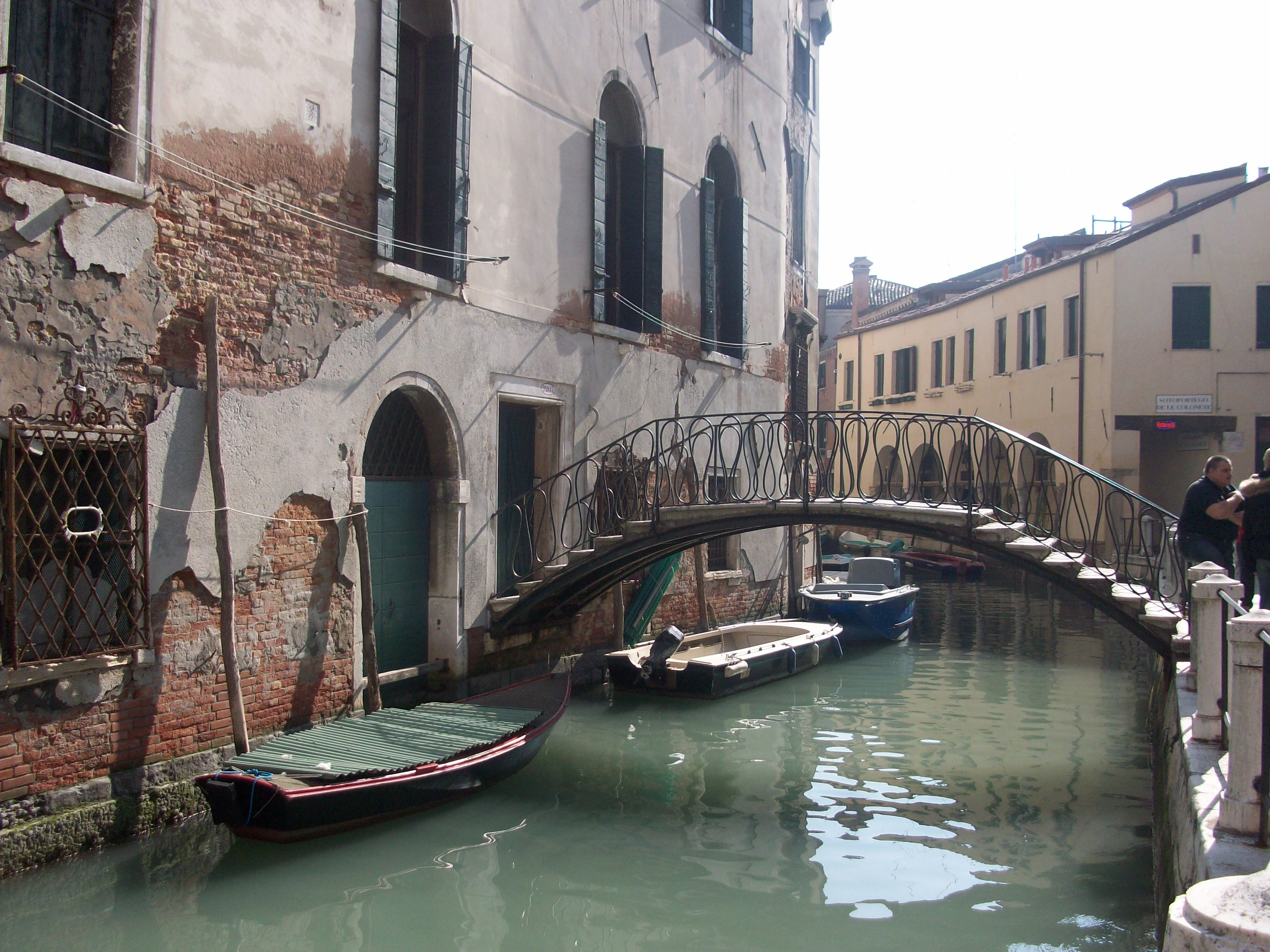
Private bridge over the rio de la Madalena

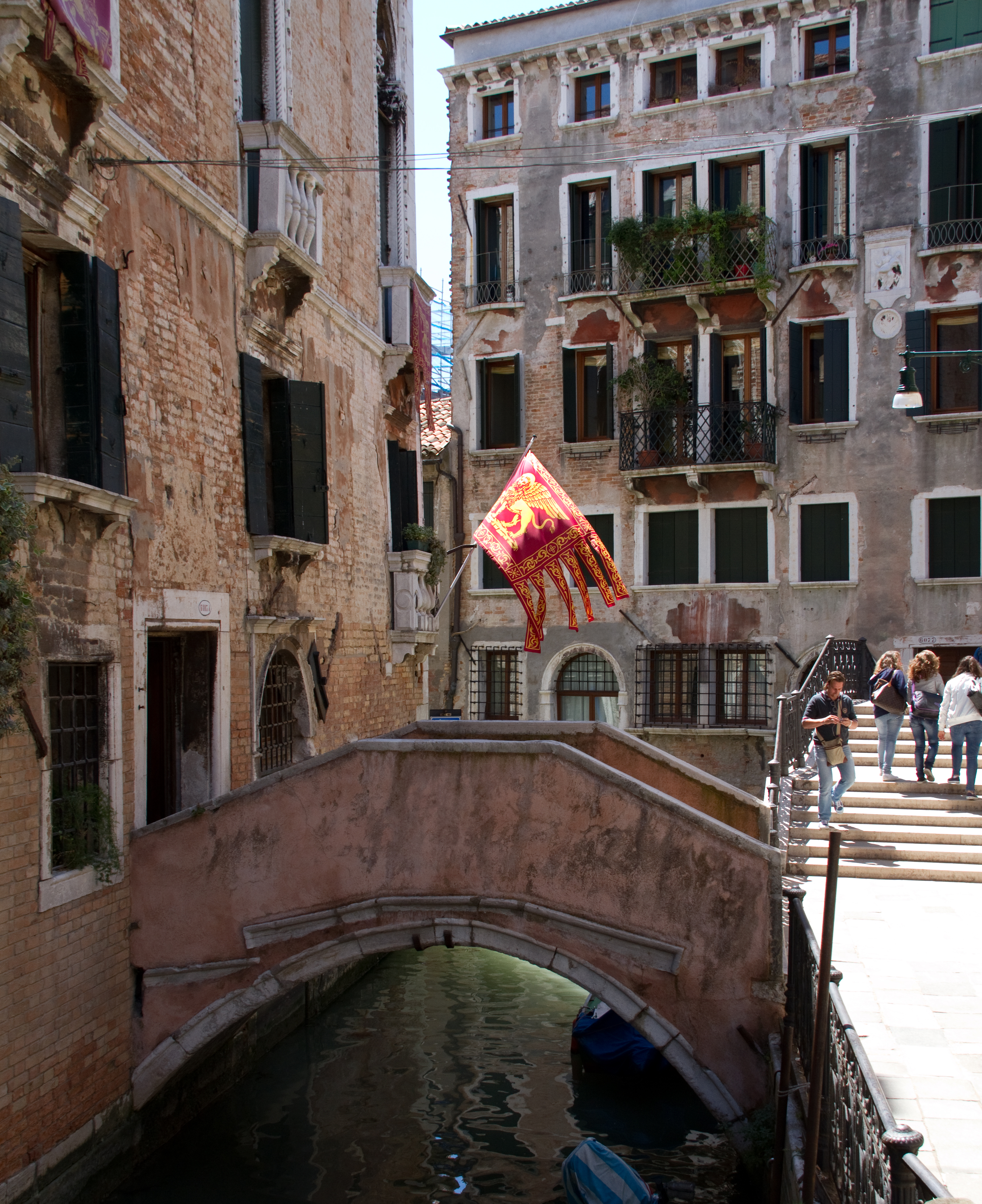
Private bridge of the palais Pisani over the rio della Panada

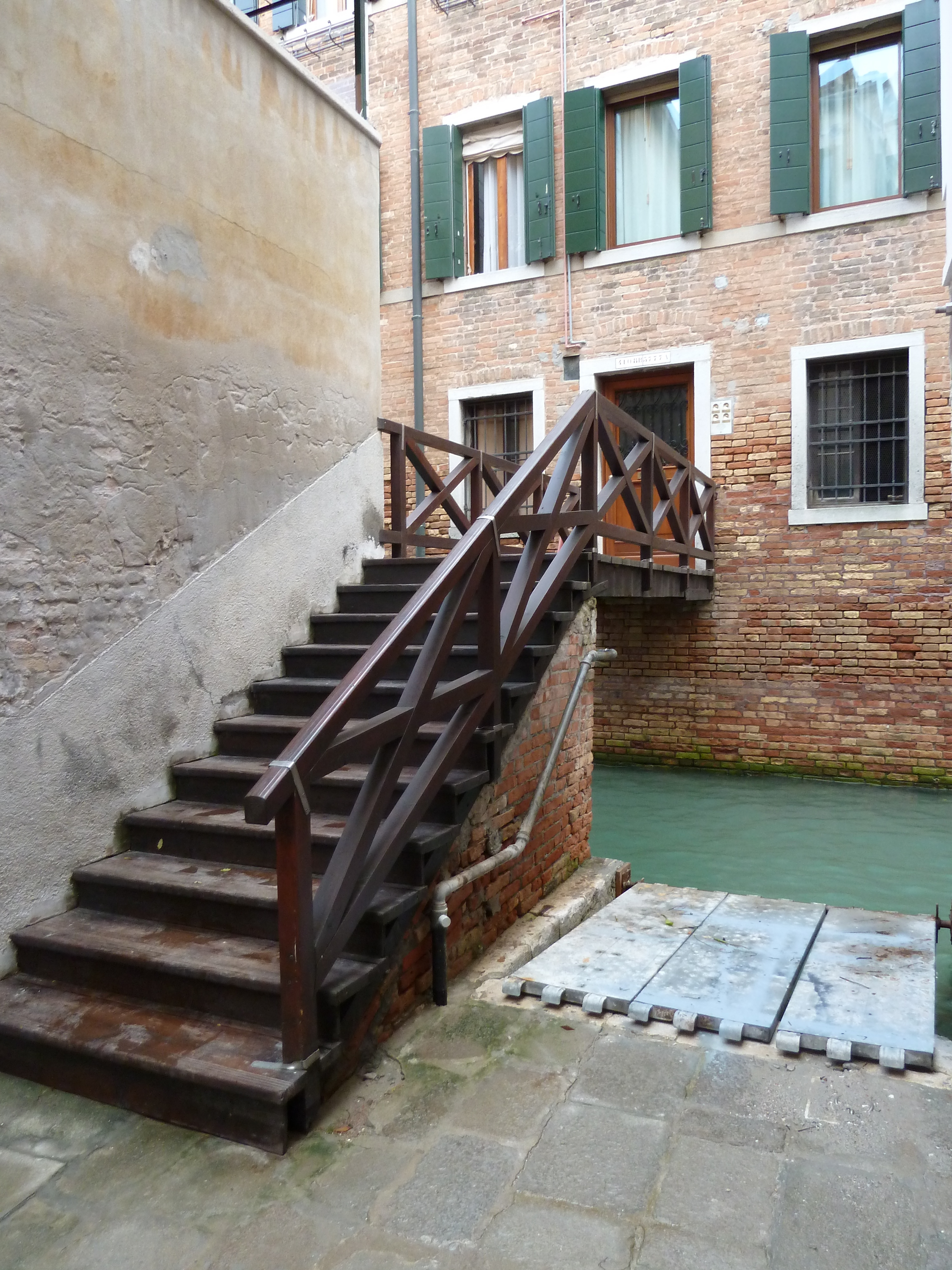
Private bridge over the rio de la Racheta

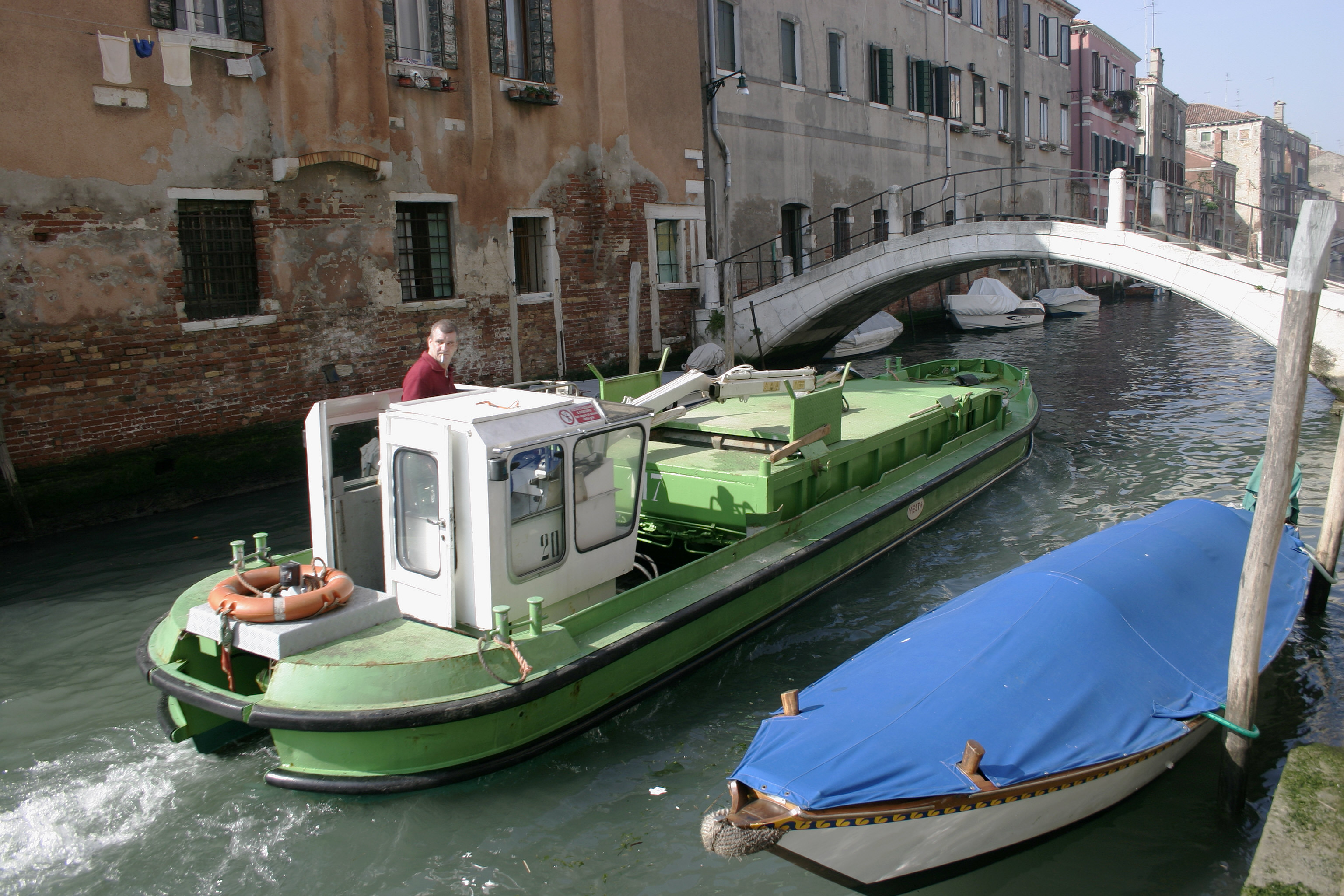
Private bridge over the rio de la Sensa

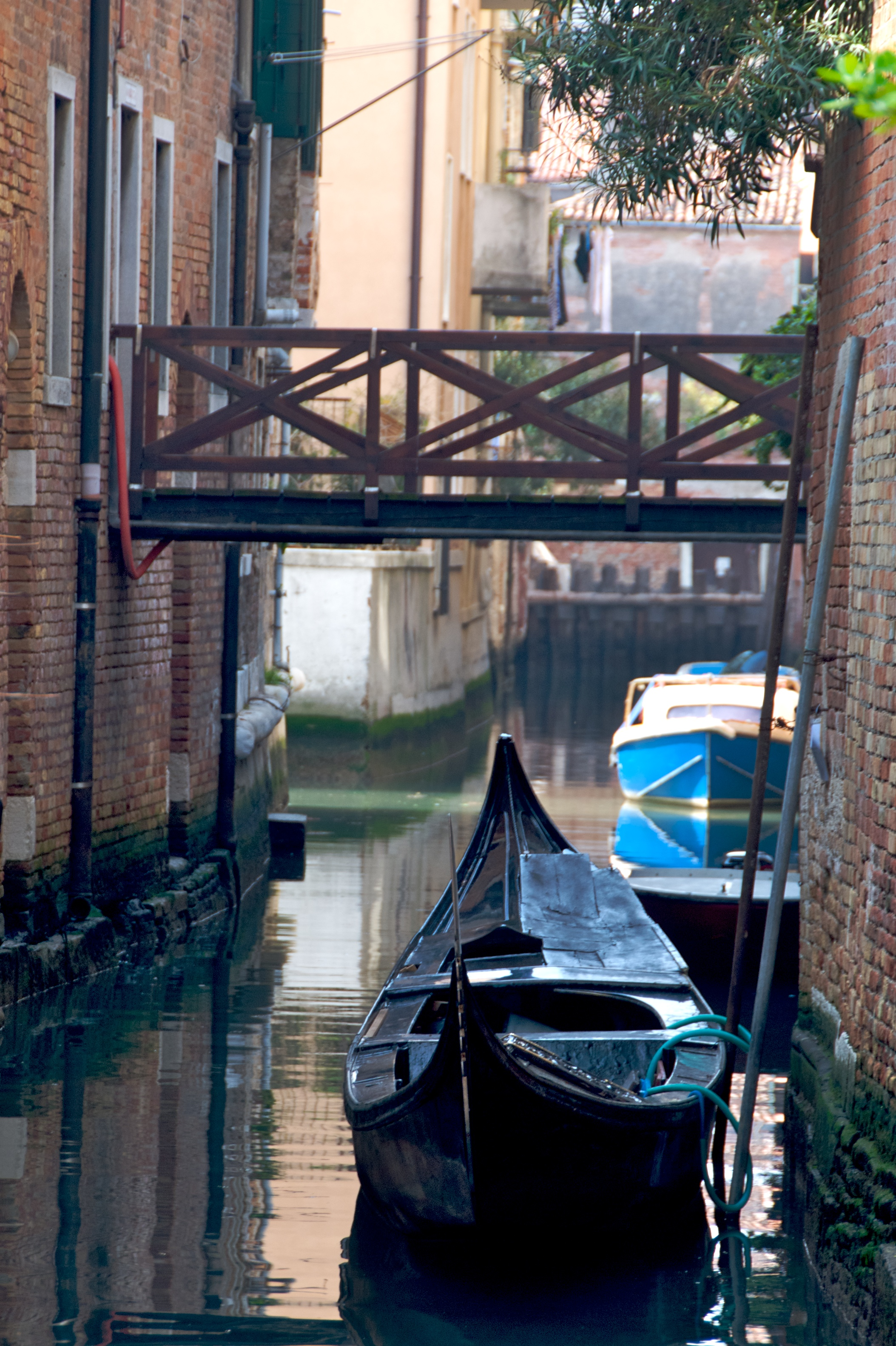
Private bridge (No. 621/A-E), rio de San Giobbe

=== Border Cannaregio-Castello ===
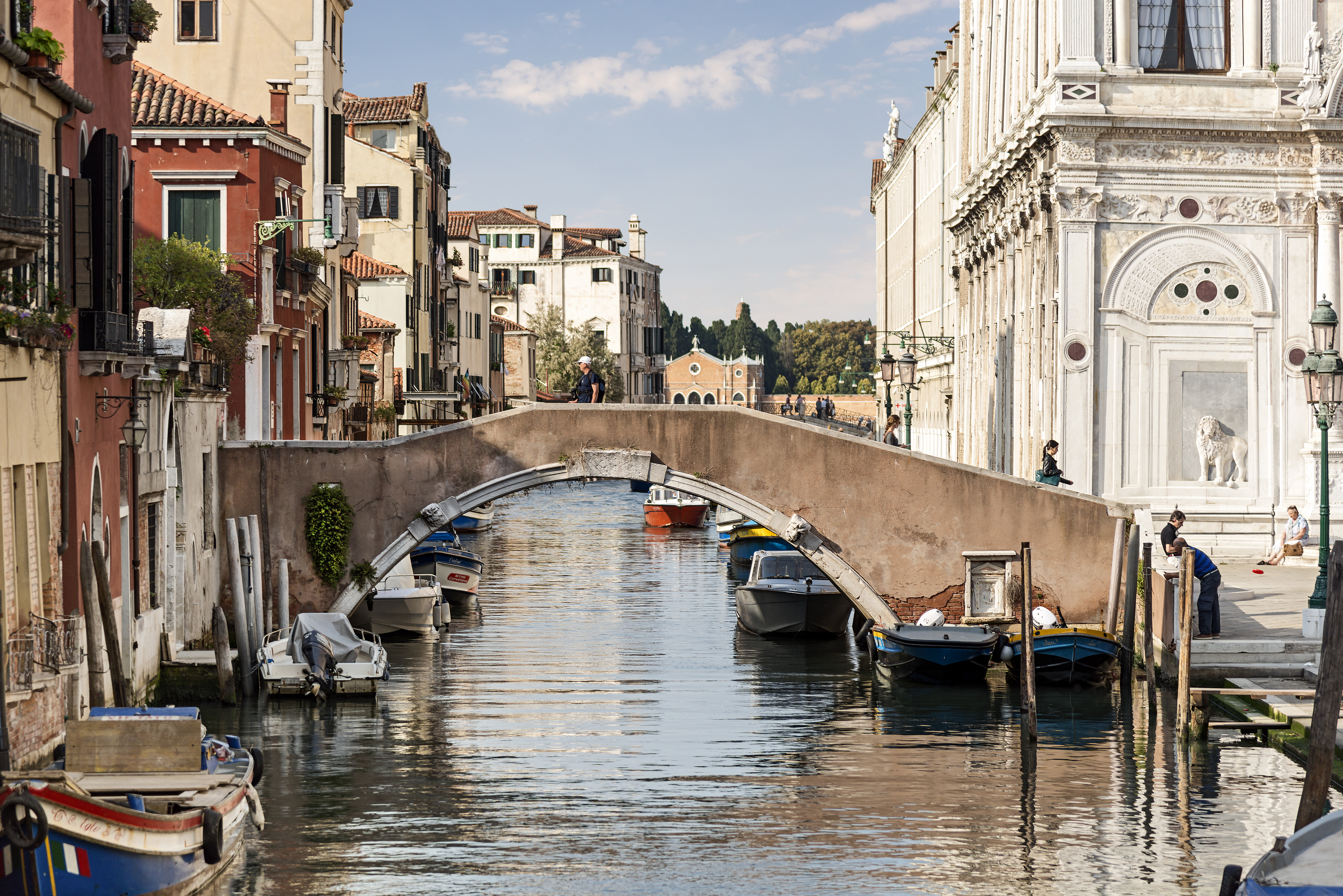
Ponte Cavallo
Rio dei Mendicanti

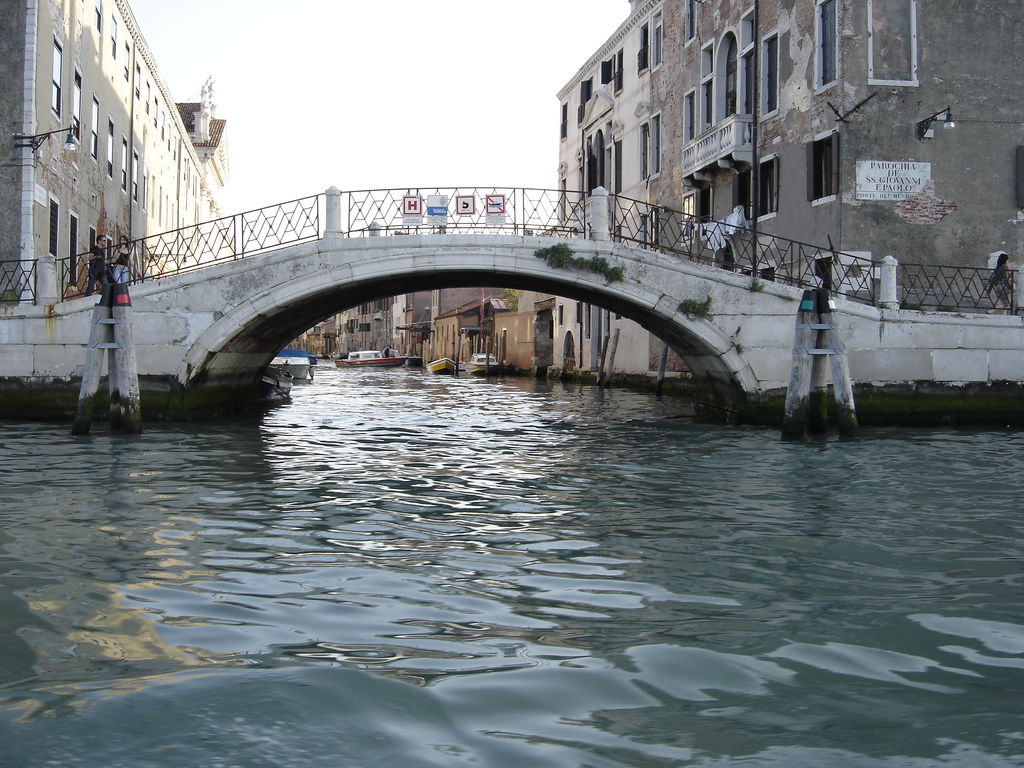
Ponte dei Mendicanti
Rio dei Mendicanti

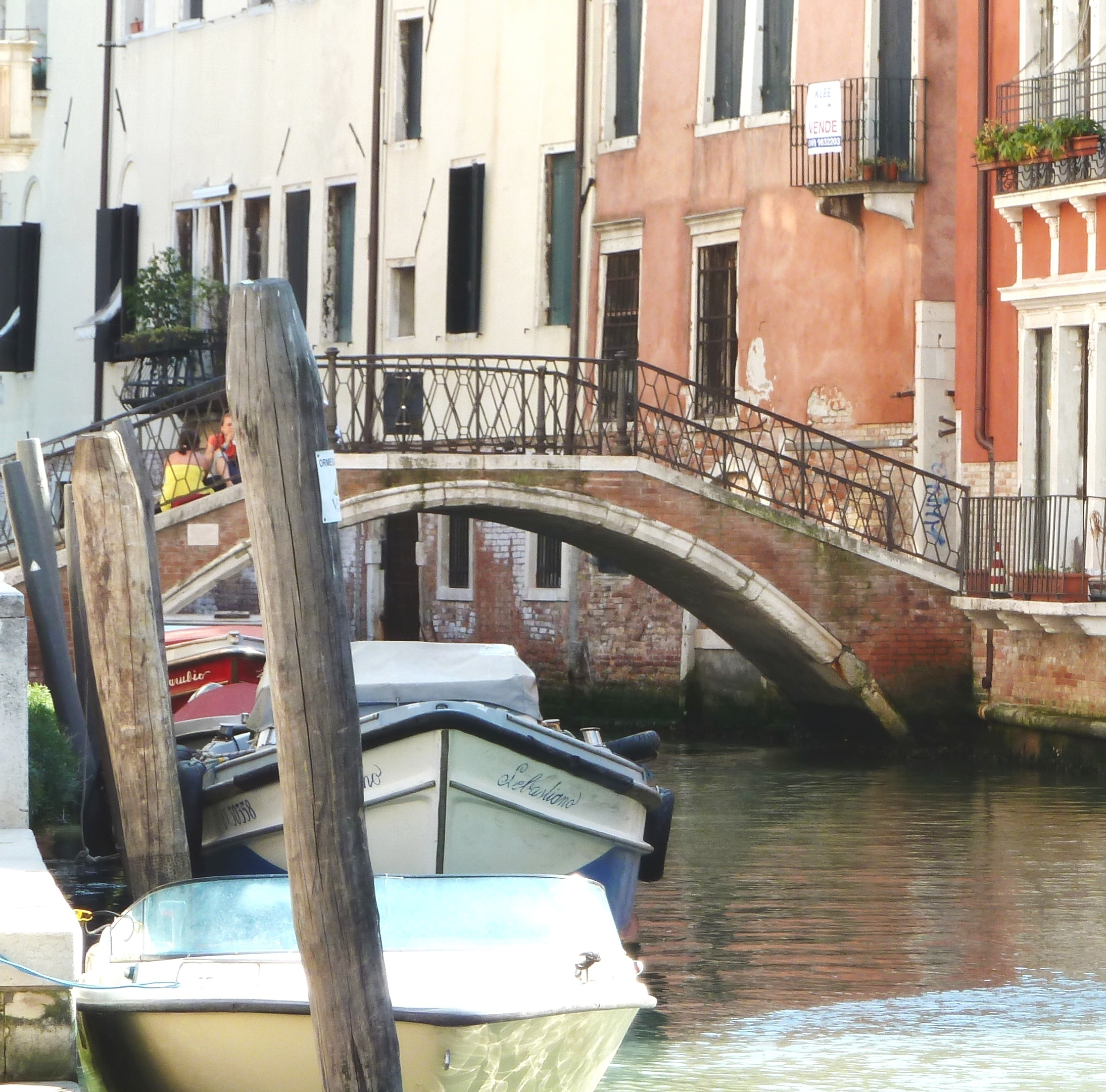
Ponte Rosso

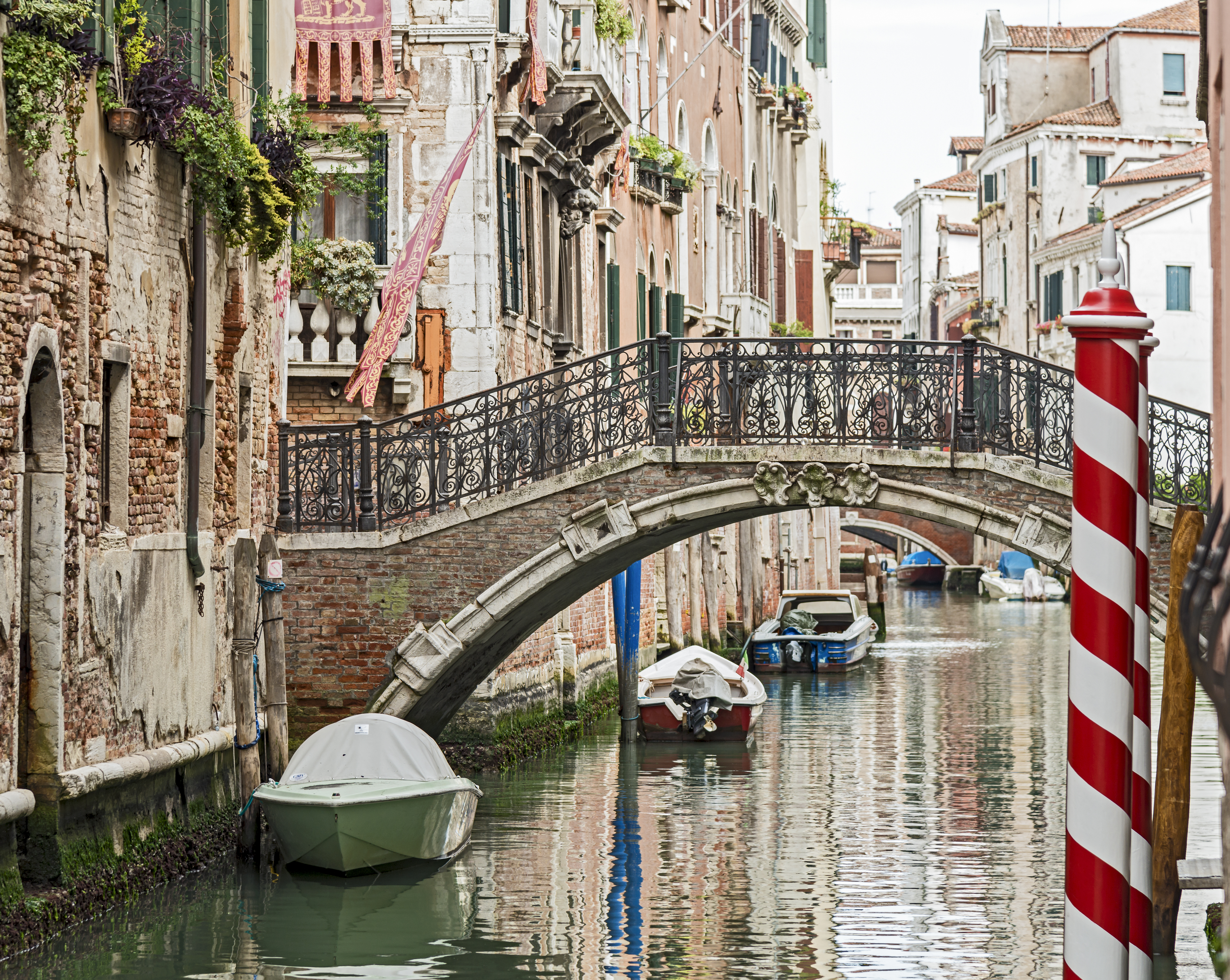
Ponte del Cristo
Rio de Santa Marina

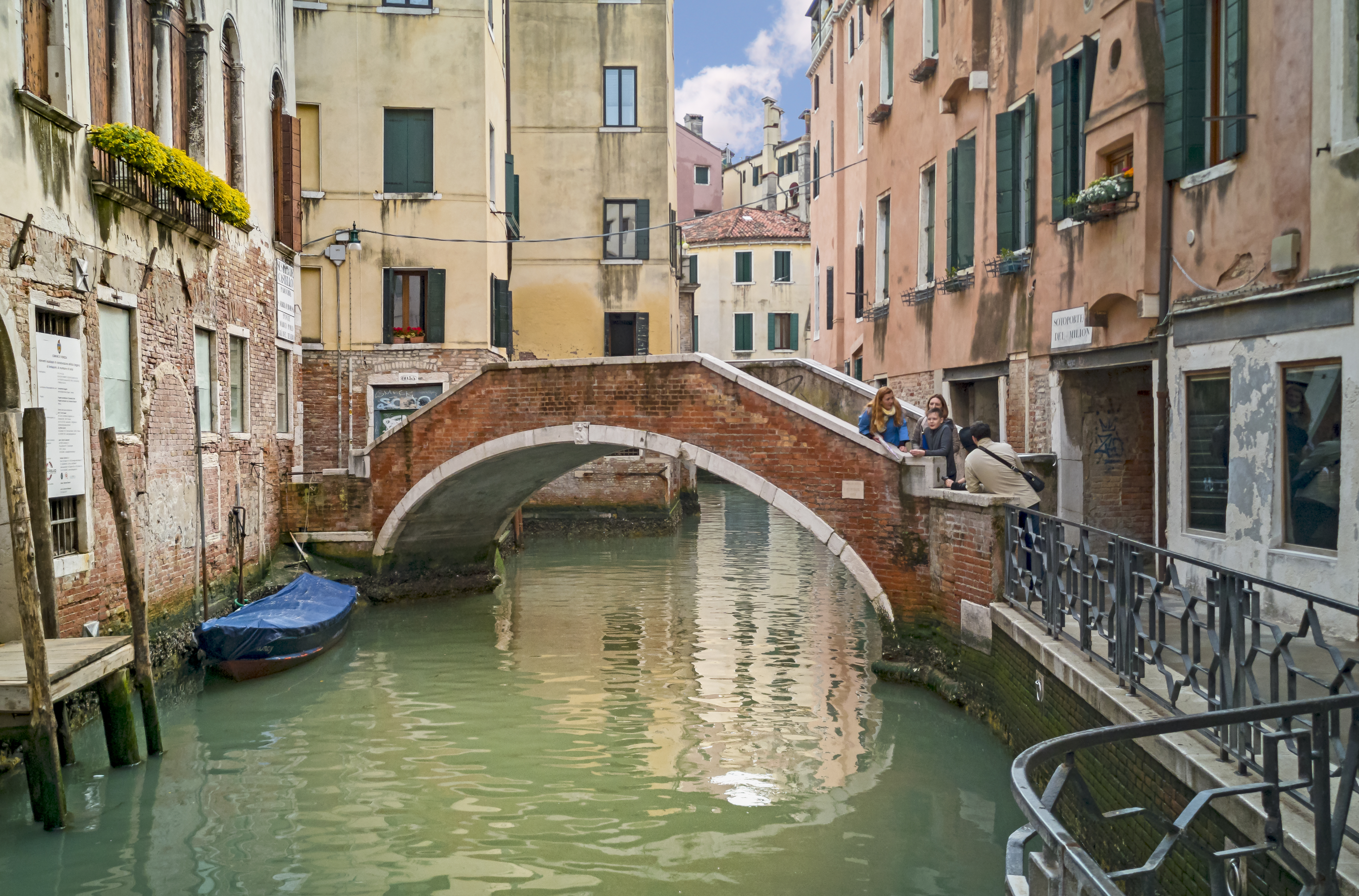
Ponte Marco Polo/ del Teatro
Rio de San Lio - Miracoli

== Sestieri of San Marco ==
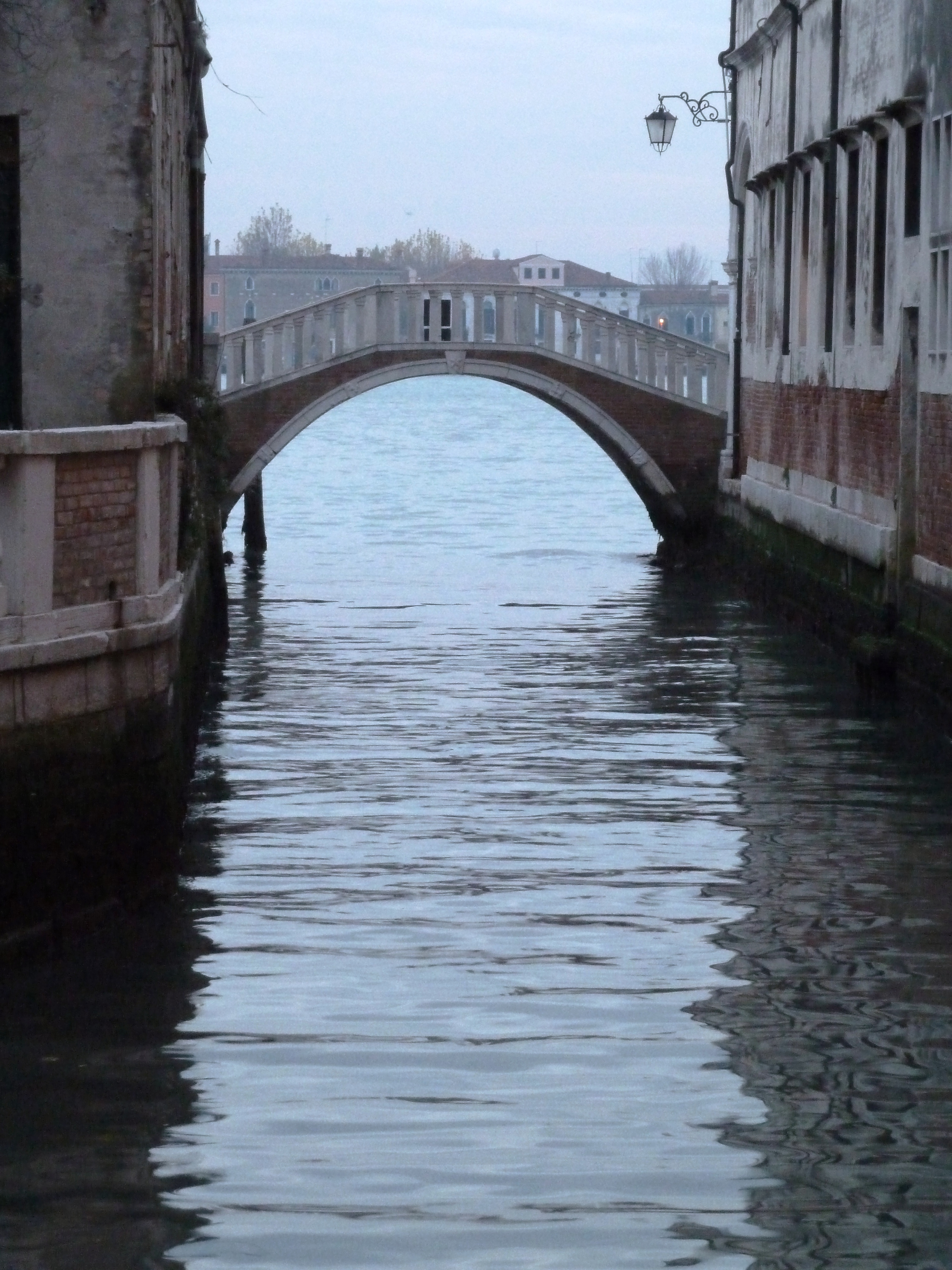
Ponte de l'Academia dei Pittori
Rio de la Luna

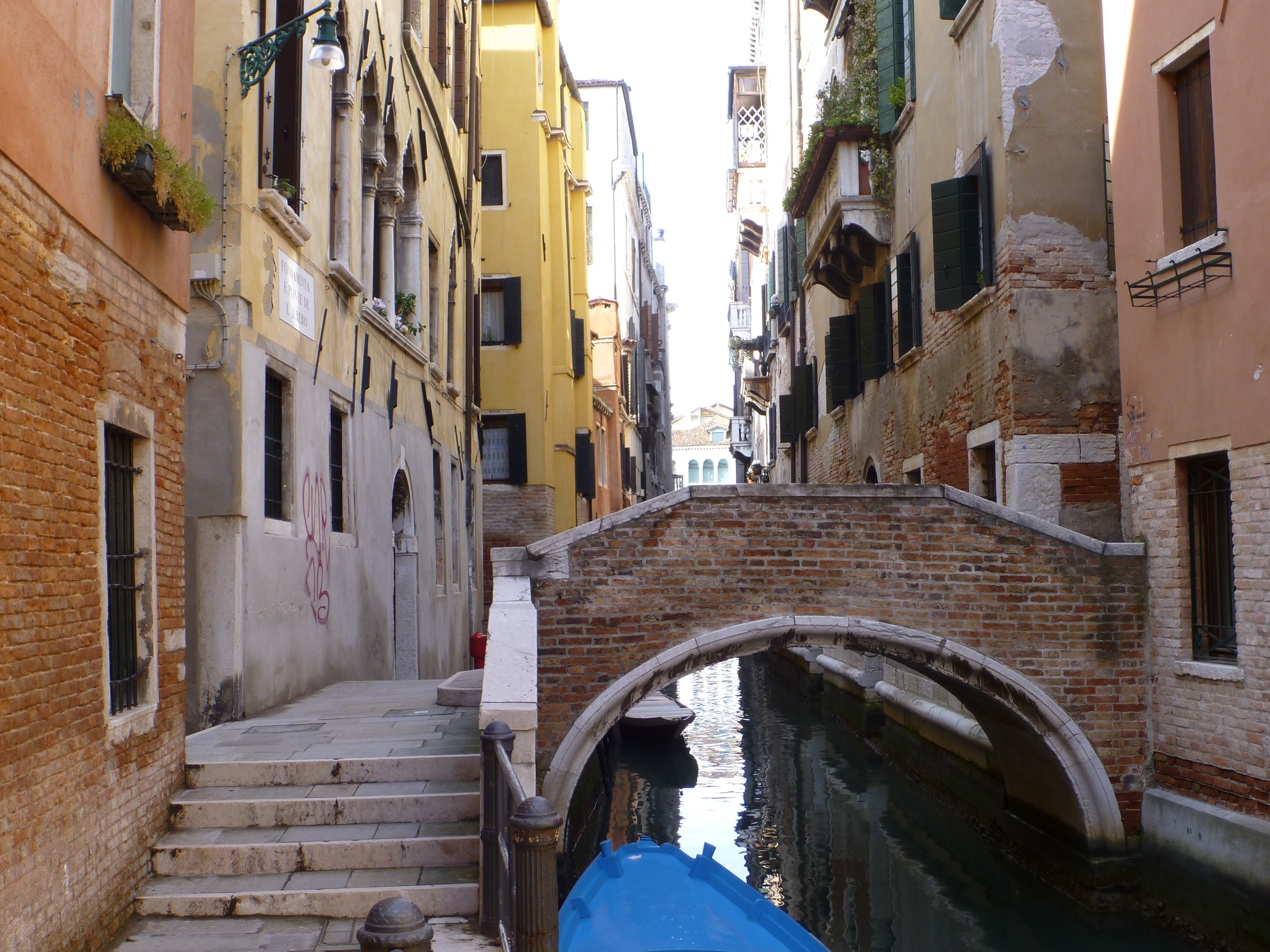
Ponte de l'Albero
Rio de Ca' Corner

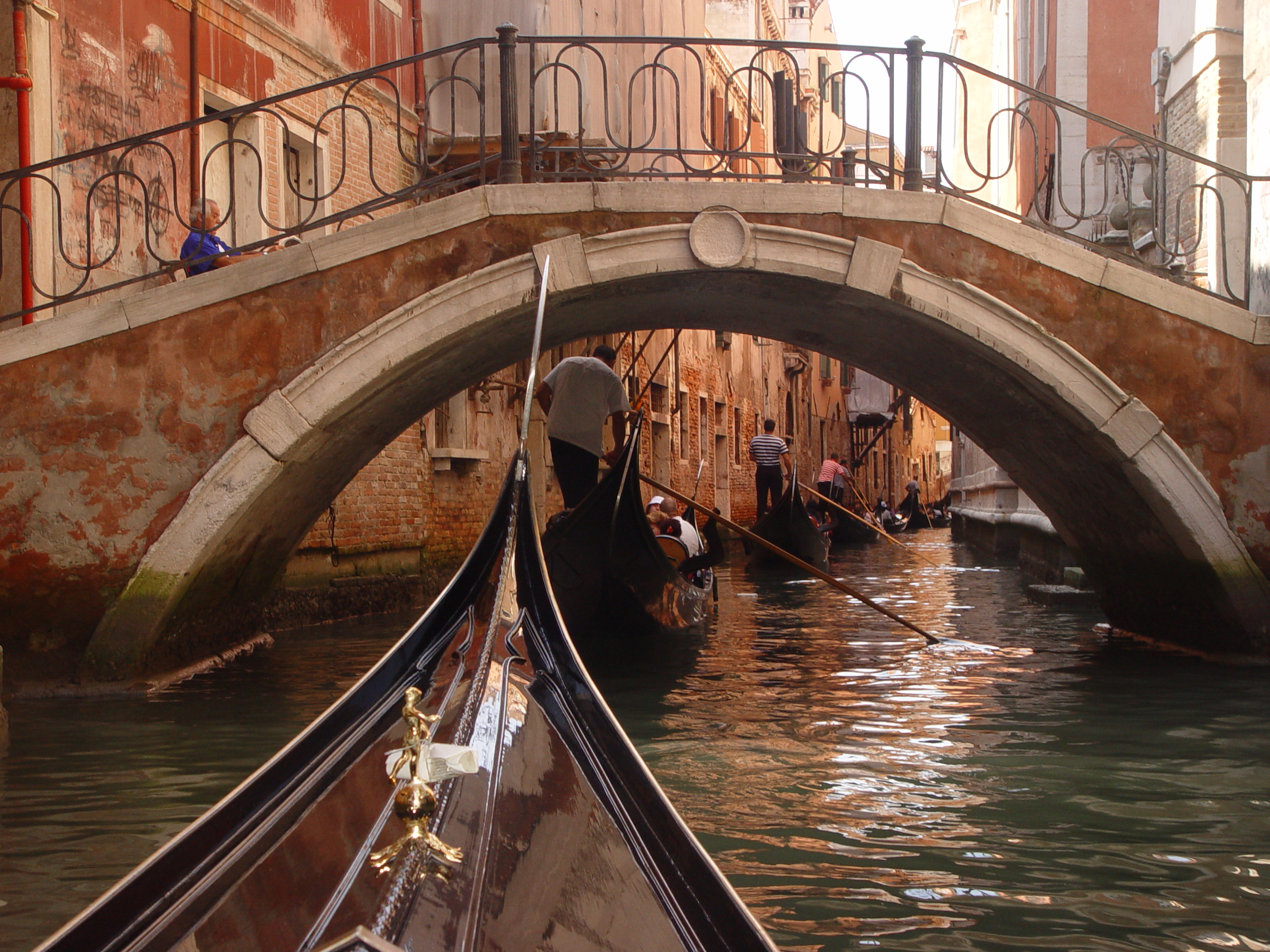
Ponte de le Balote
Rio de San Salvador

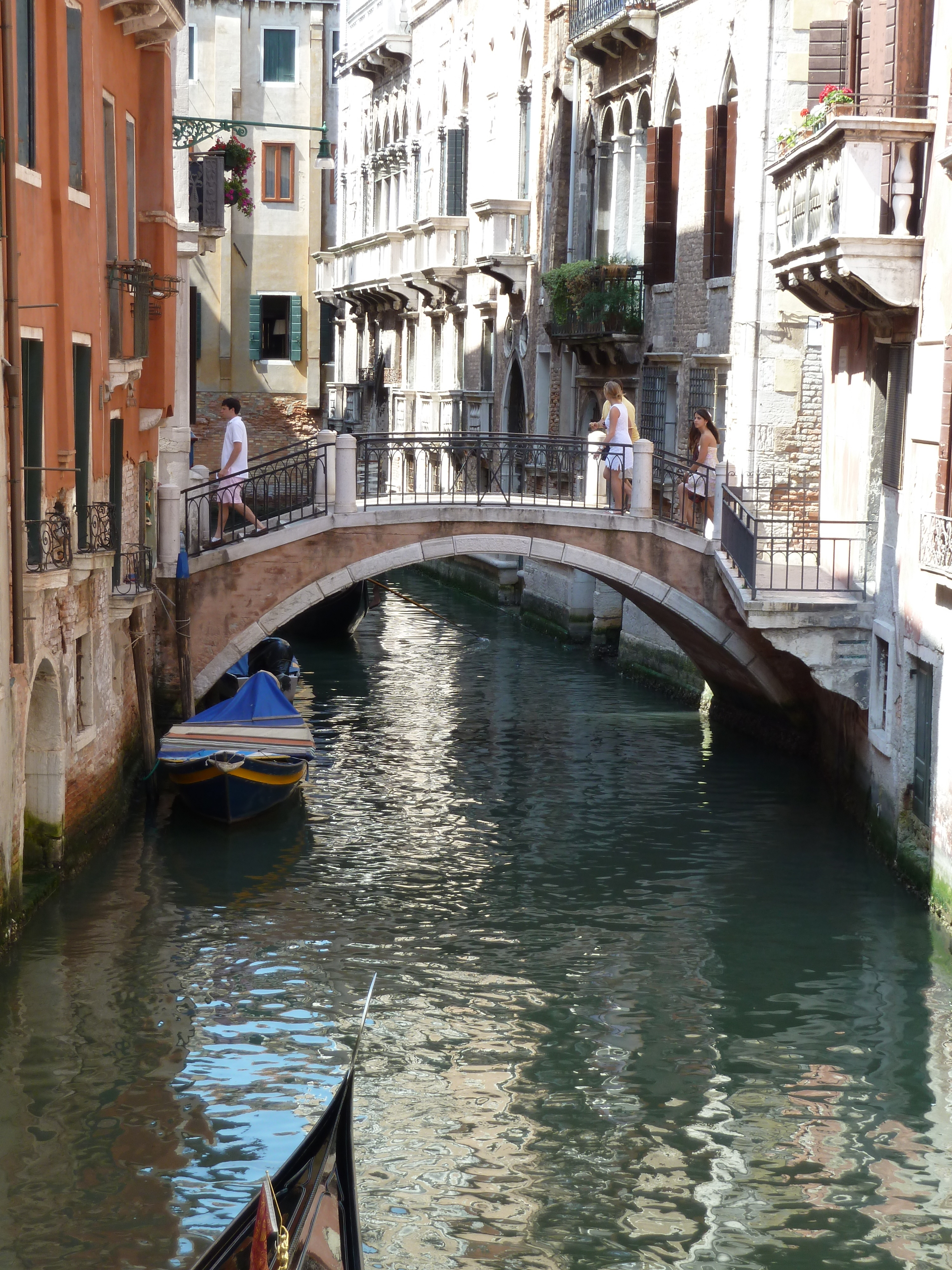
Ponte dei Barcaroli / Cuoridoro
Rio dei Barcaroli

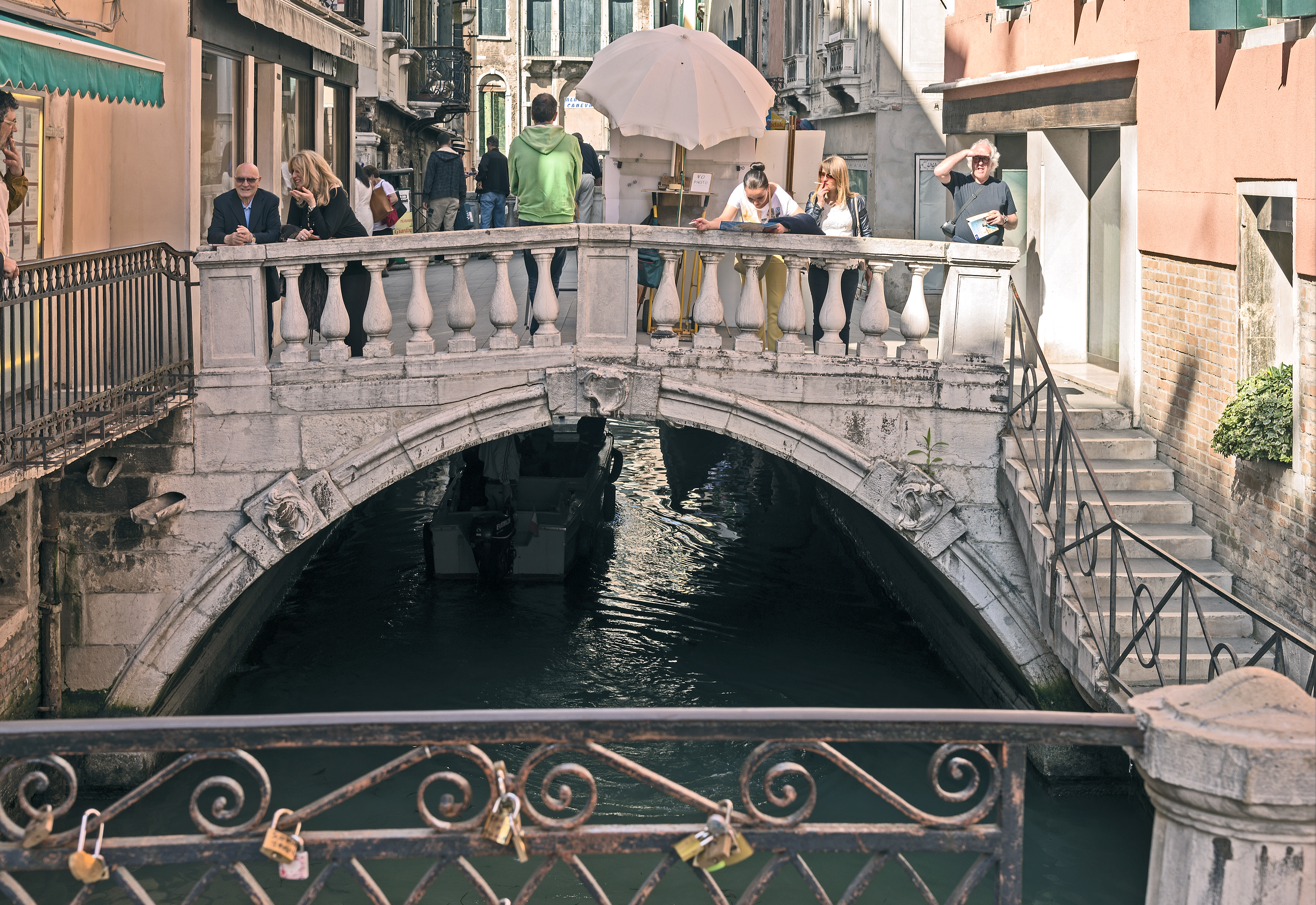
Ponte dei Bareteri
Rio dei Bareteri

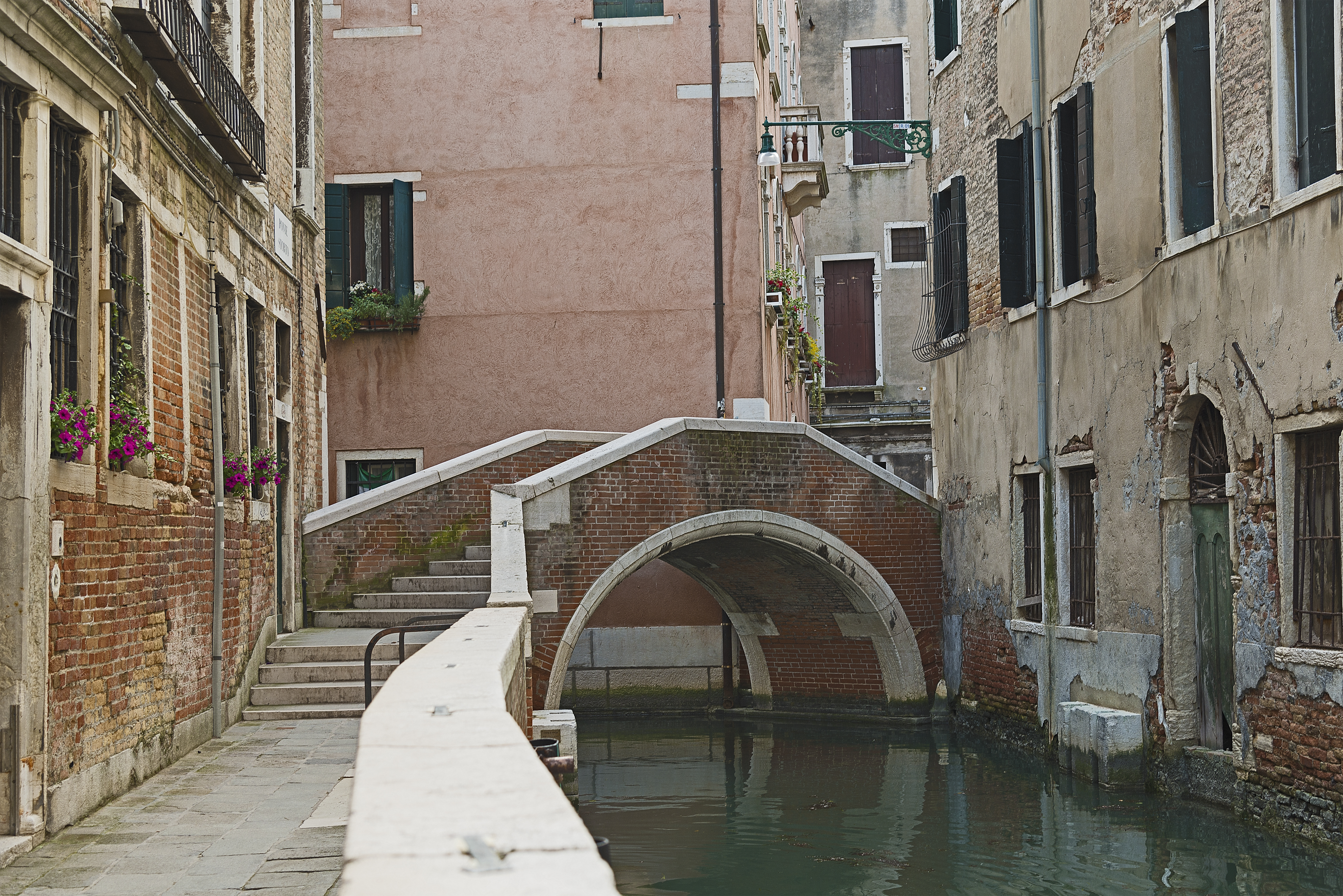
Ponte Storto o dei Callegheri
S.M.Zobenigo/Fenice

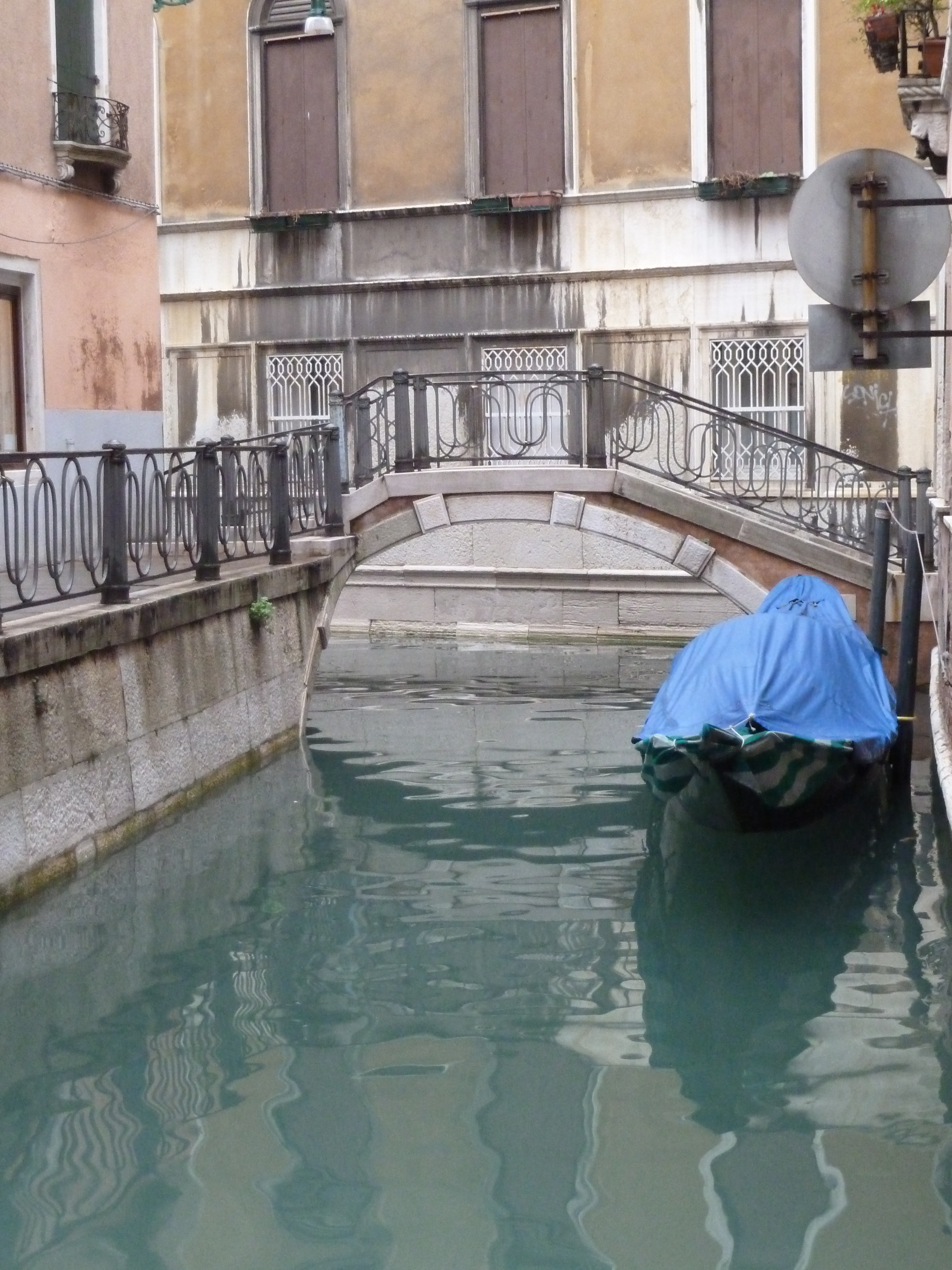
Ponte Storto o Caotorta
Rio de la Verona

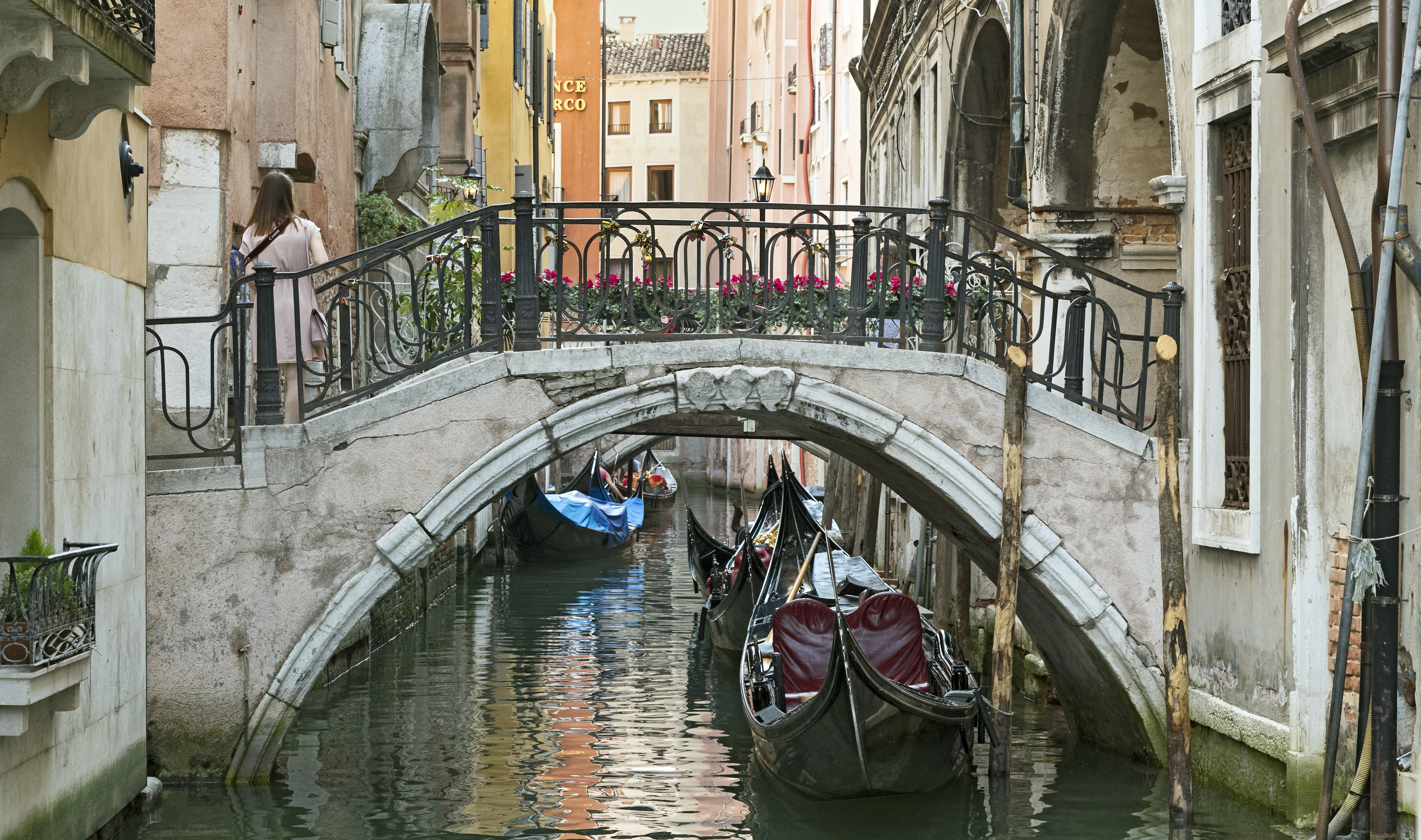
Ponte del Cavalletto
Rio de le Procuratie

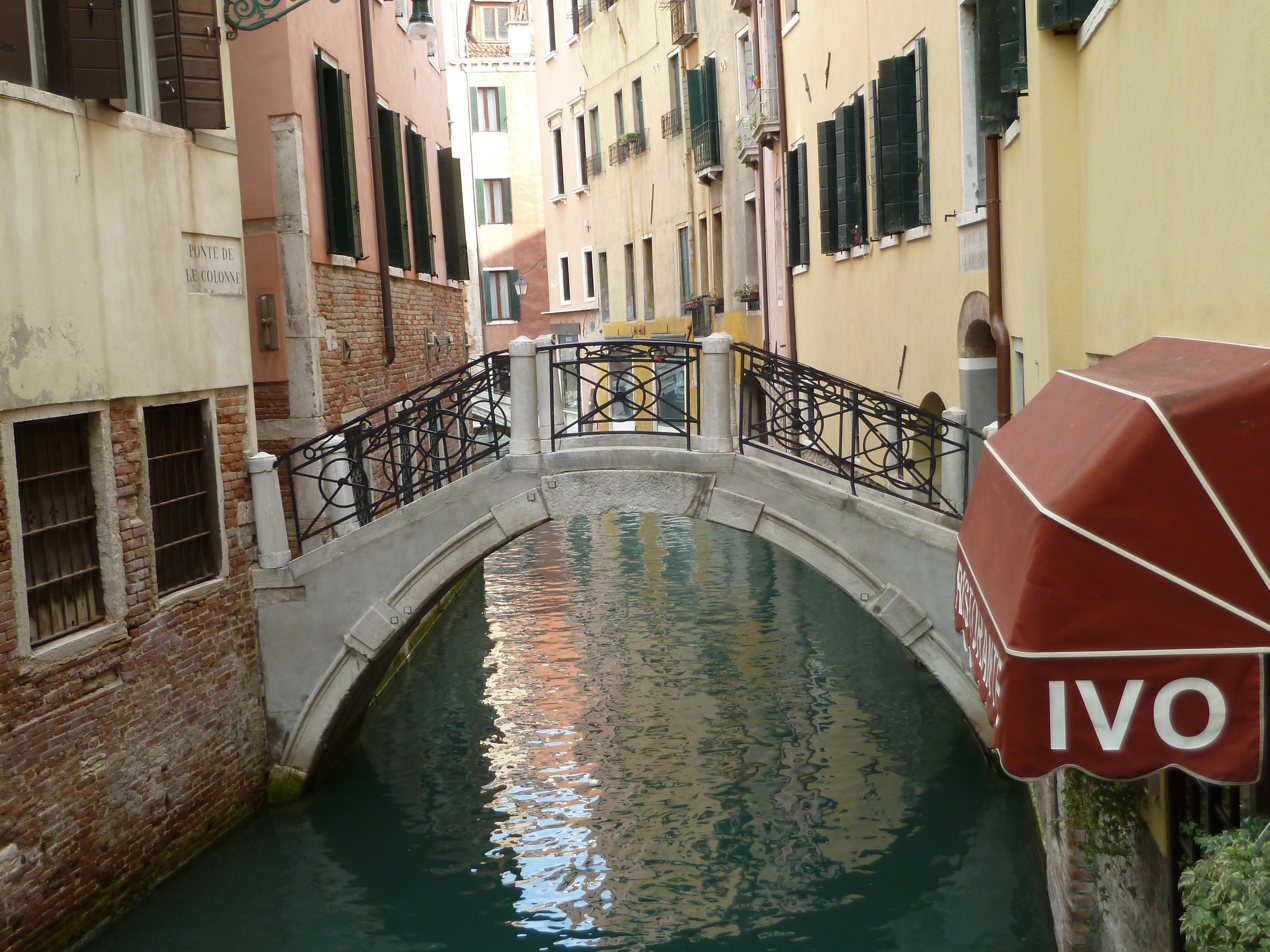
Ponte de le Colonne
Rio dei Fuseri

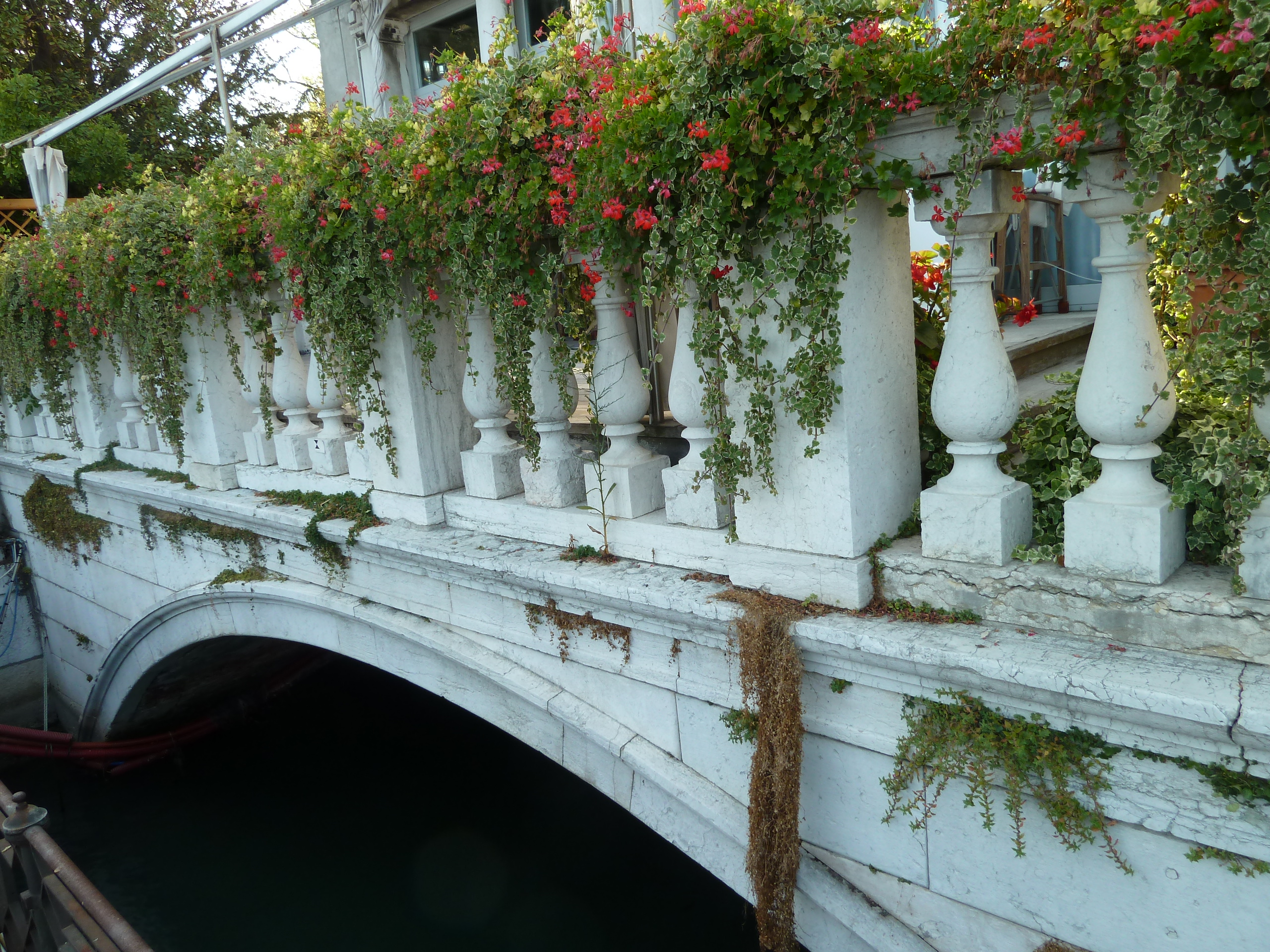
Ponte de la Compagnia de la Vela
Rio de la Luna

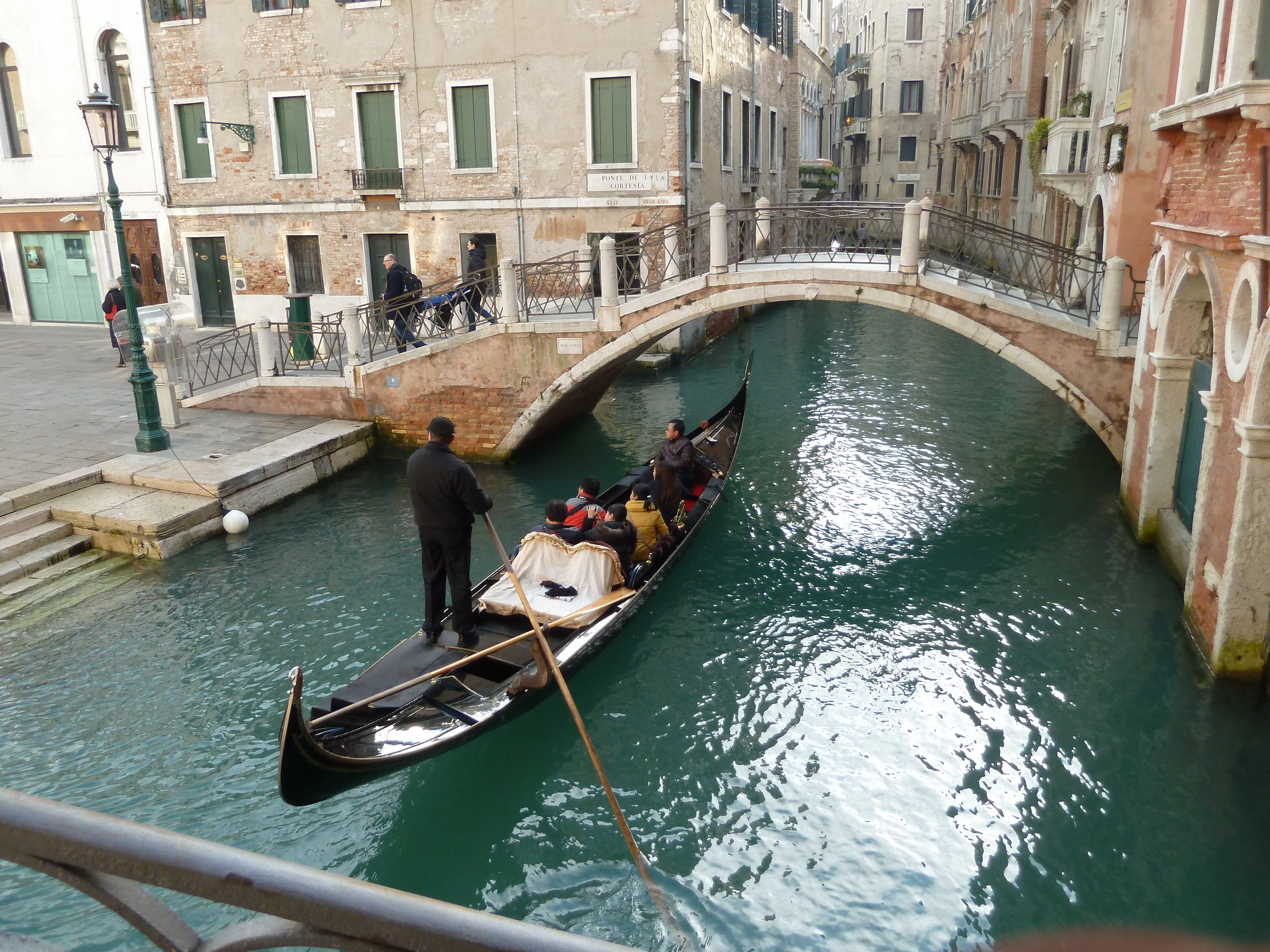
Ponte de la Cortesia
Rio de San Luca

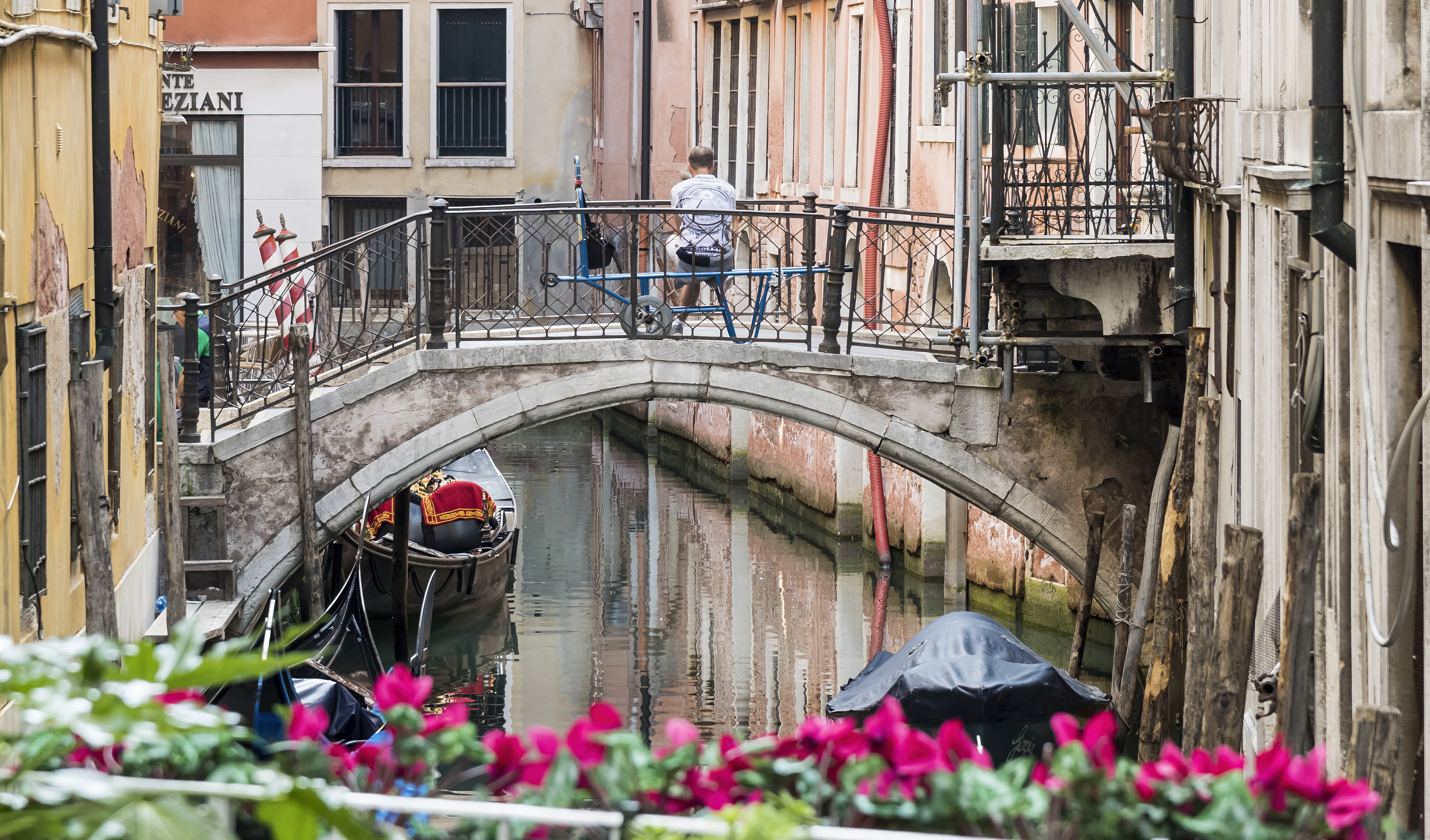
Ponte dei Dai
Rio de le Procuratie

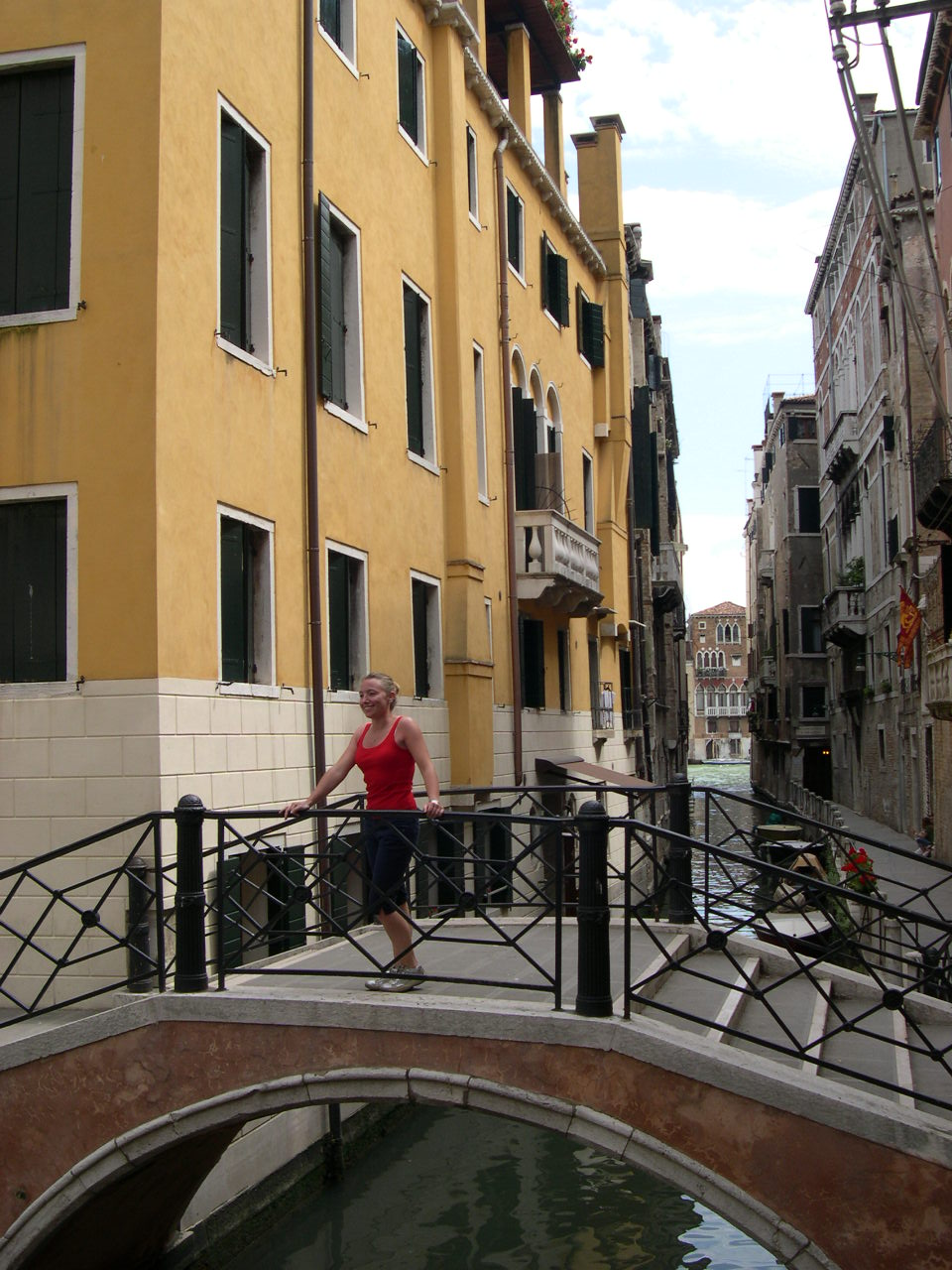
Ponte Duodo ou Barbarigo
S.M.Zobenigo

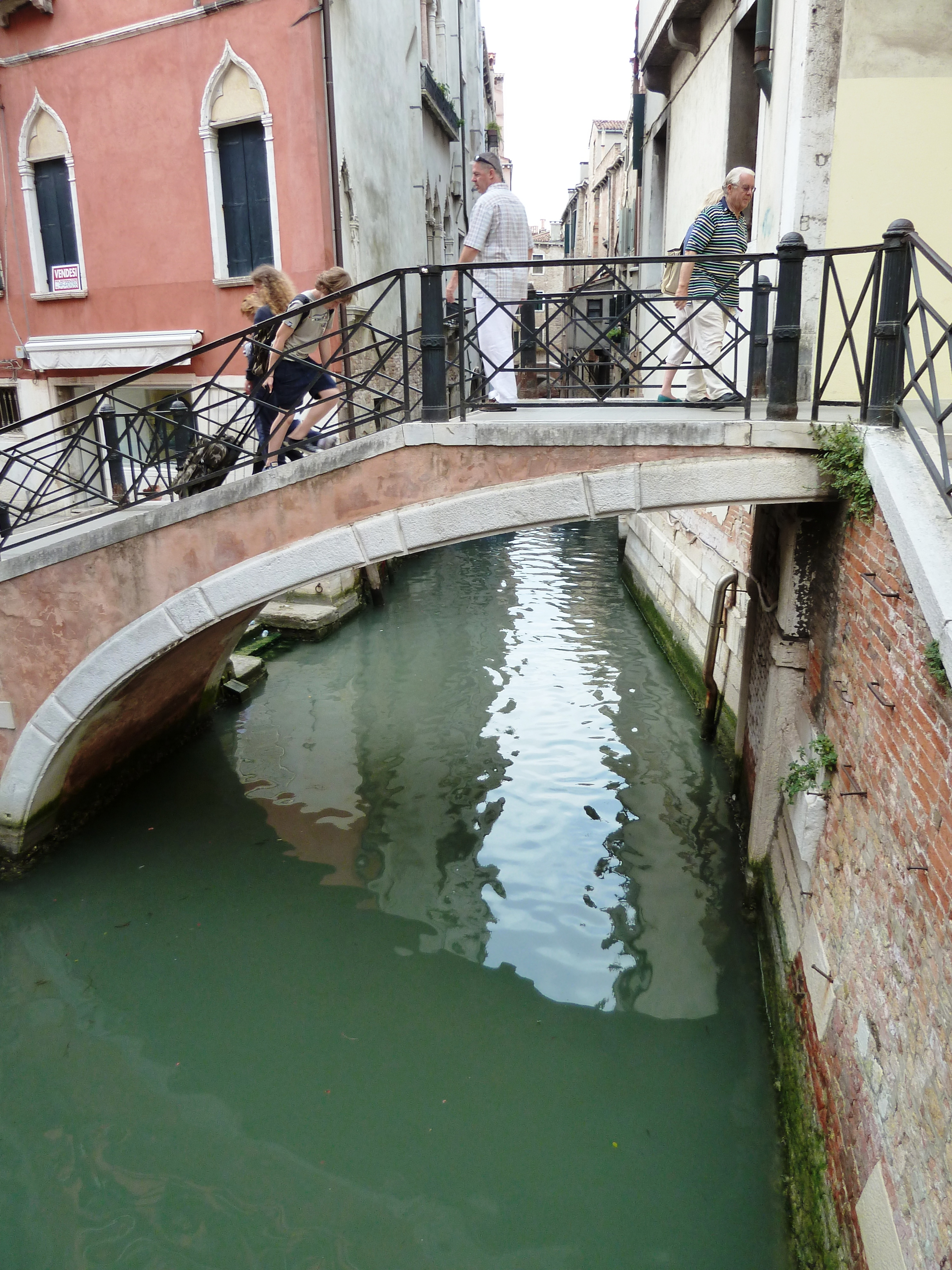
Ponte de la Feltrina
S.M.Zobenigo

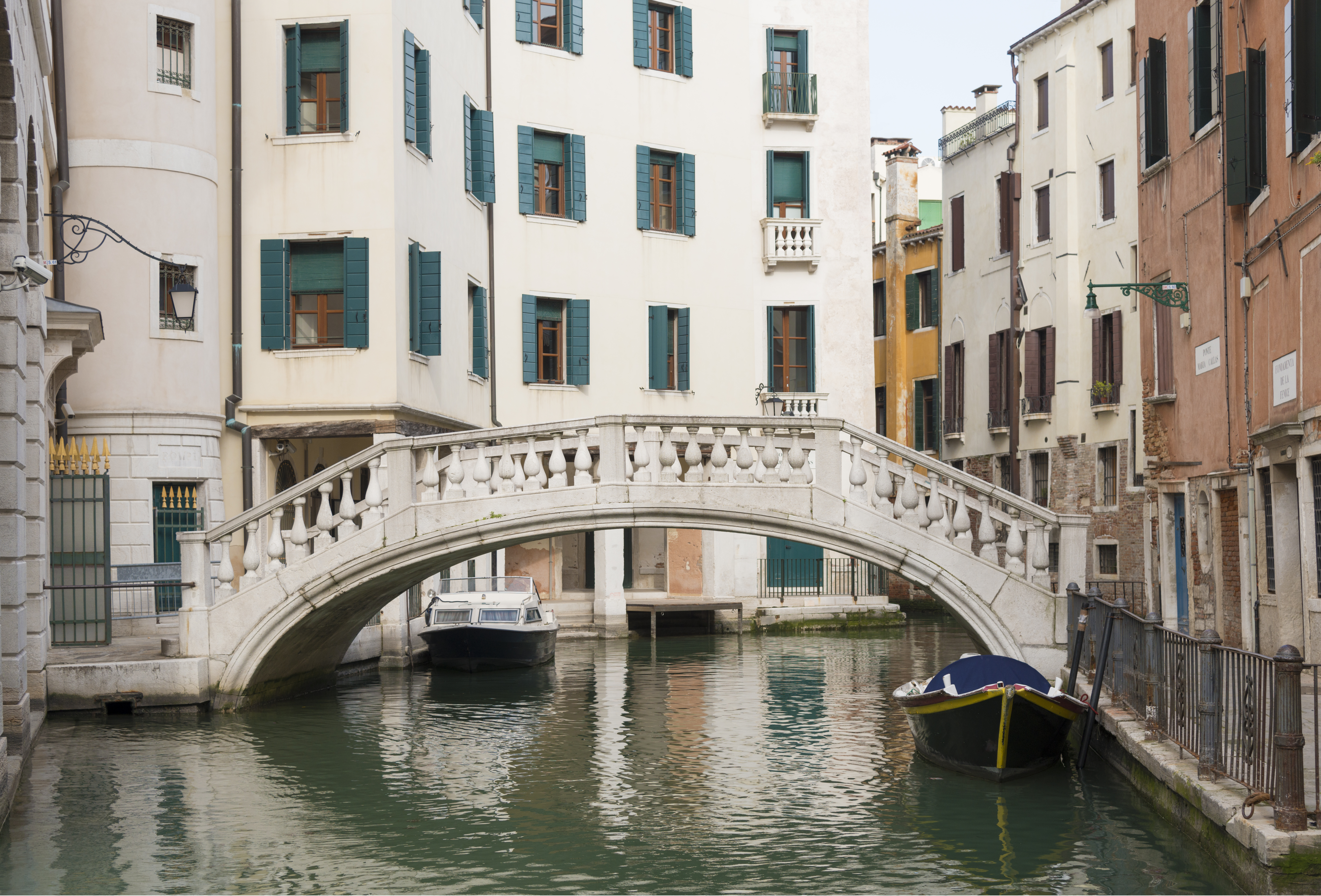
Ponte Maria Callas
/ de la Fenice
Rio de la Veste

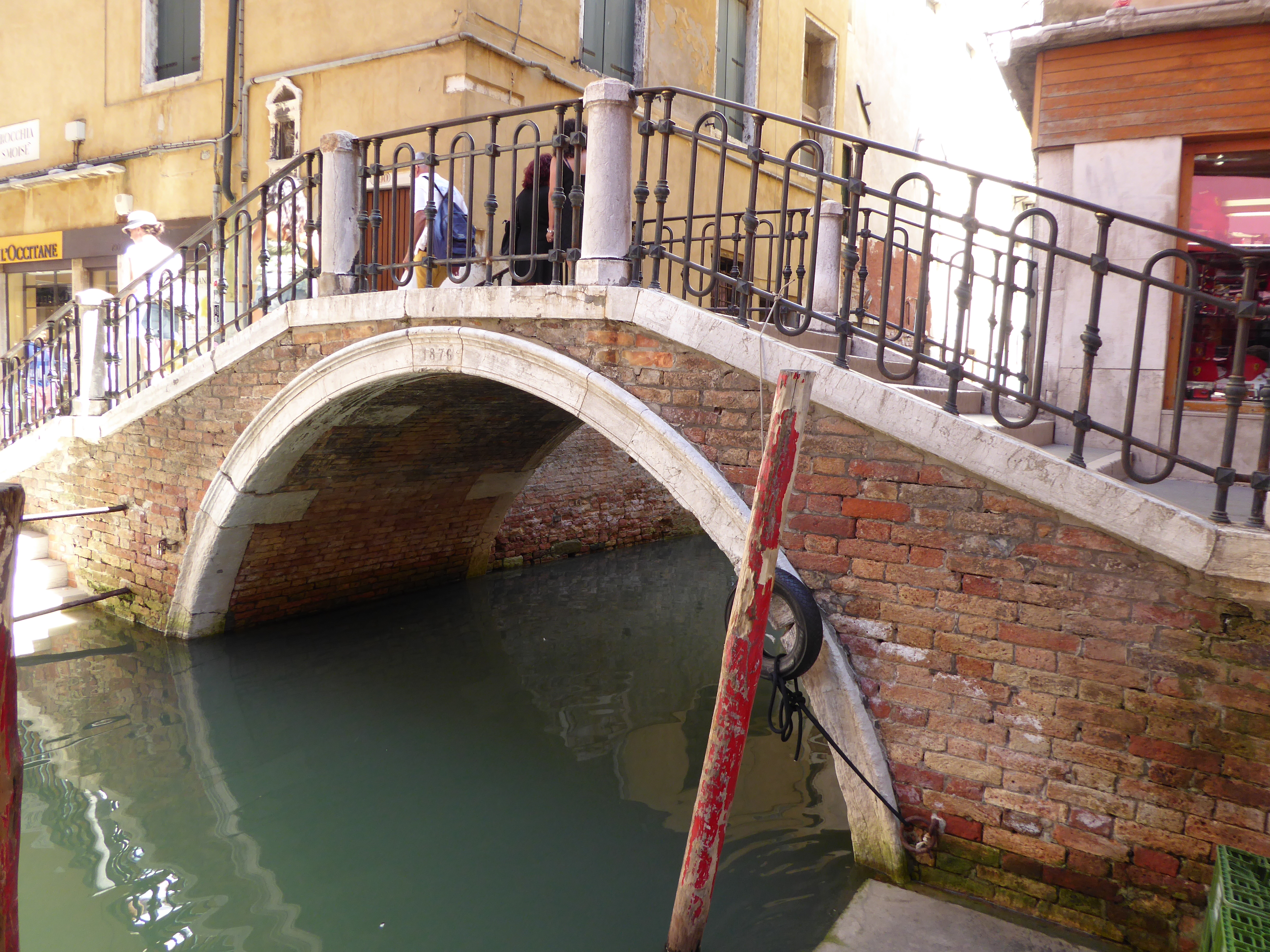
Ponte dei Ferai
Rio dei Ferai

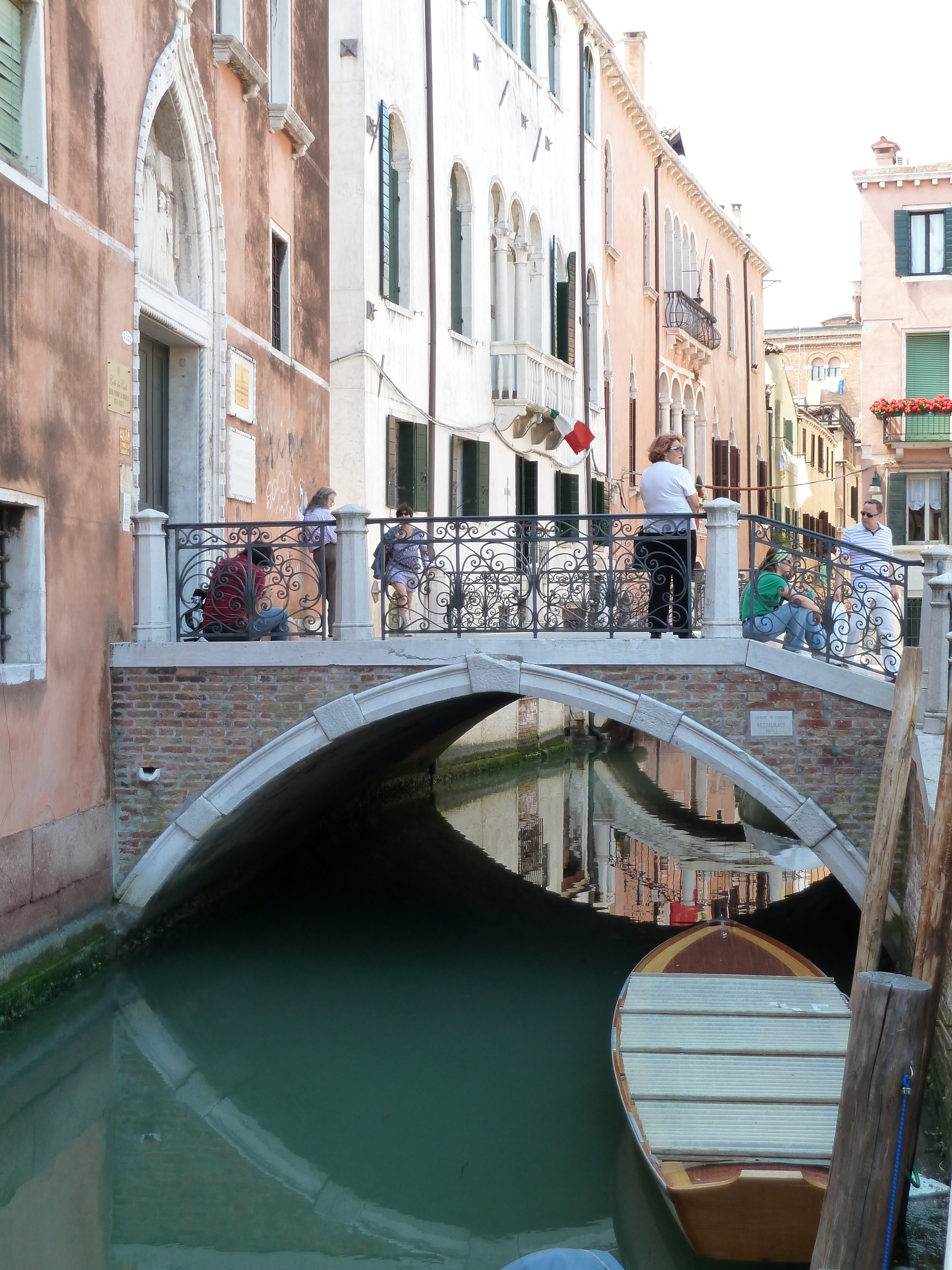
Ponte dei Frati
Rio de San Anzolo

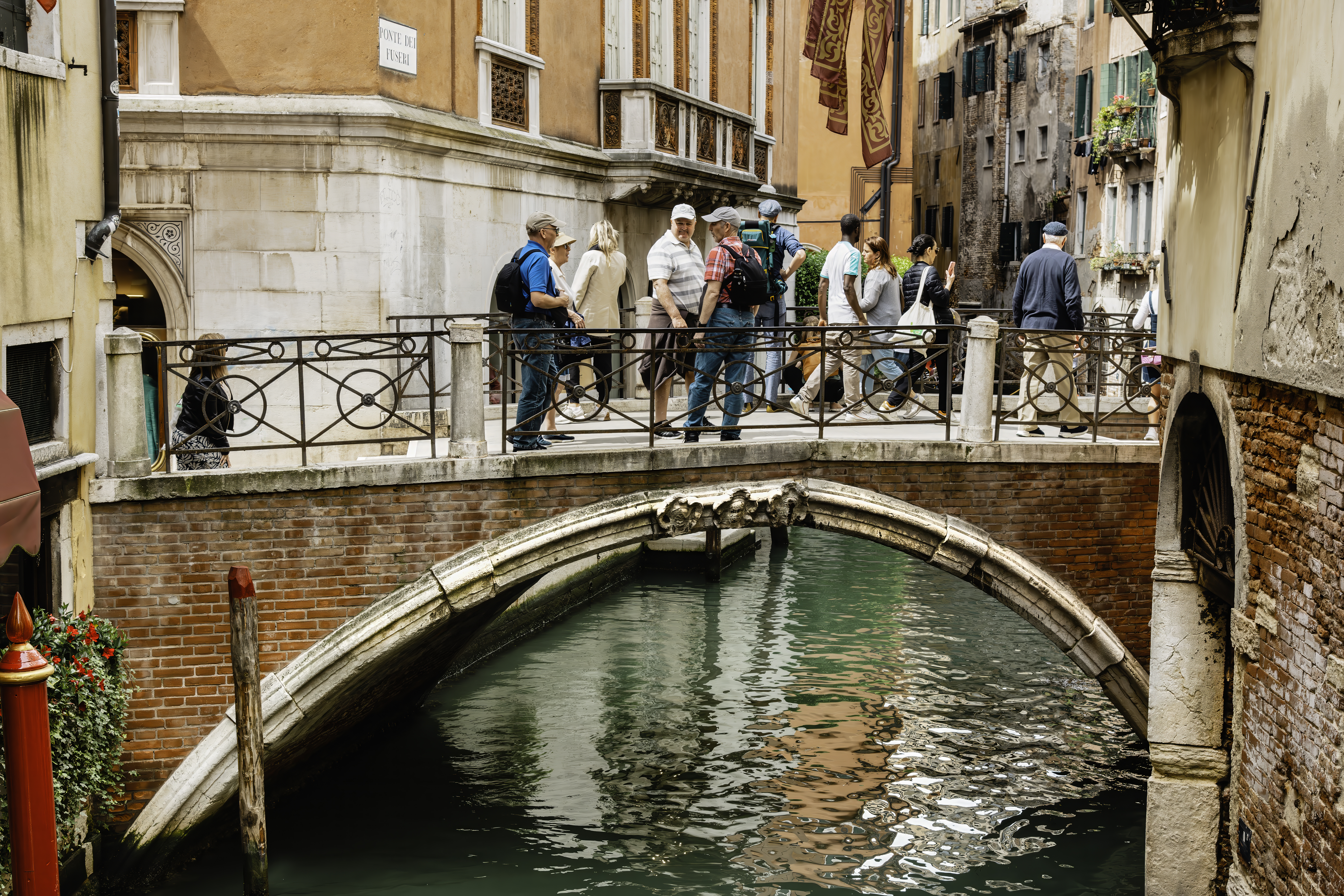
Ponte dei Fuseri
Rio dei Fuseri

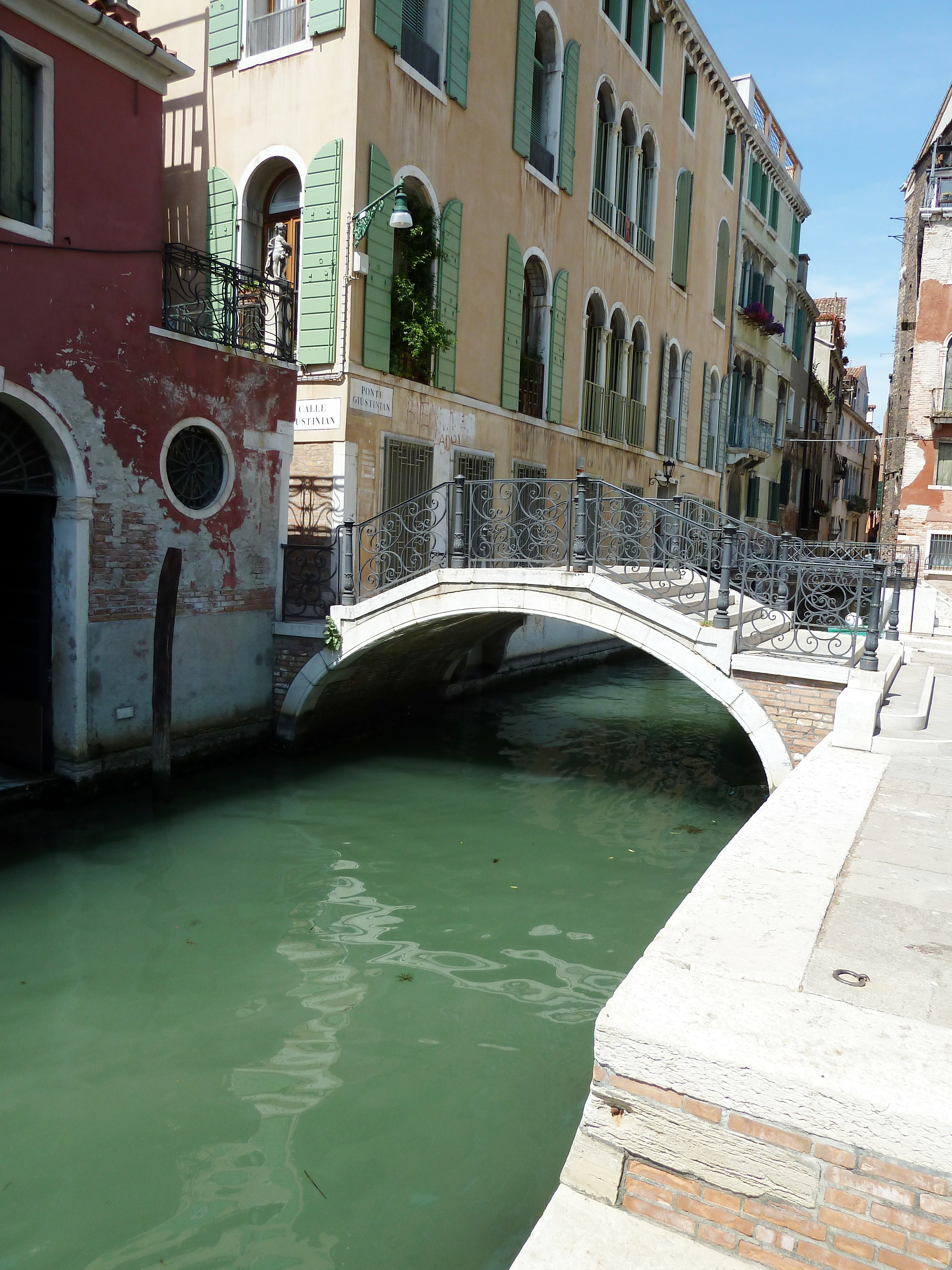
Ponte Giustinian
Rio de San Vidal

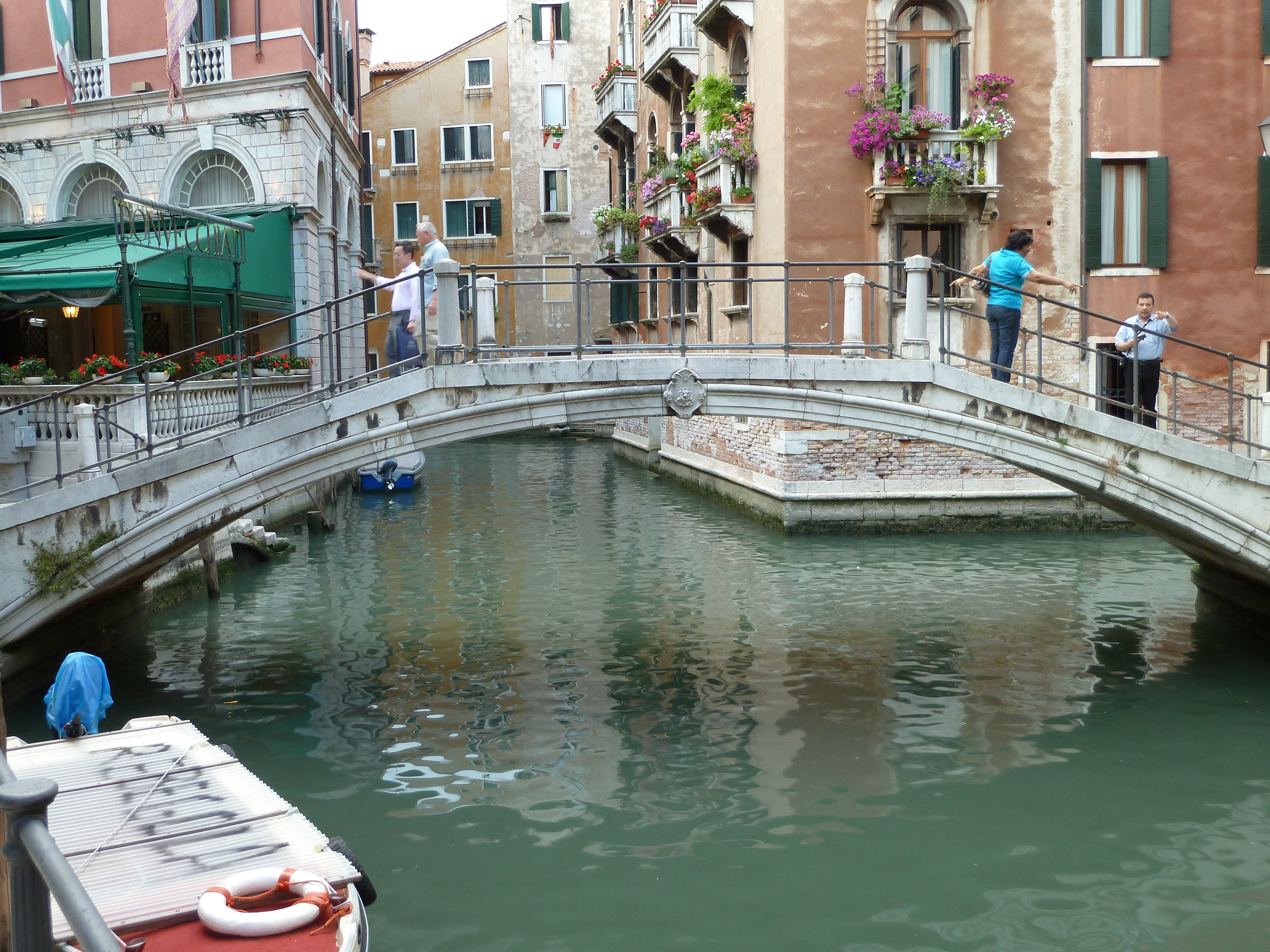
Ponte Carlo Goldoni
Rio dei Fuseri

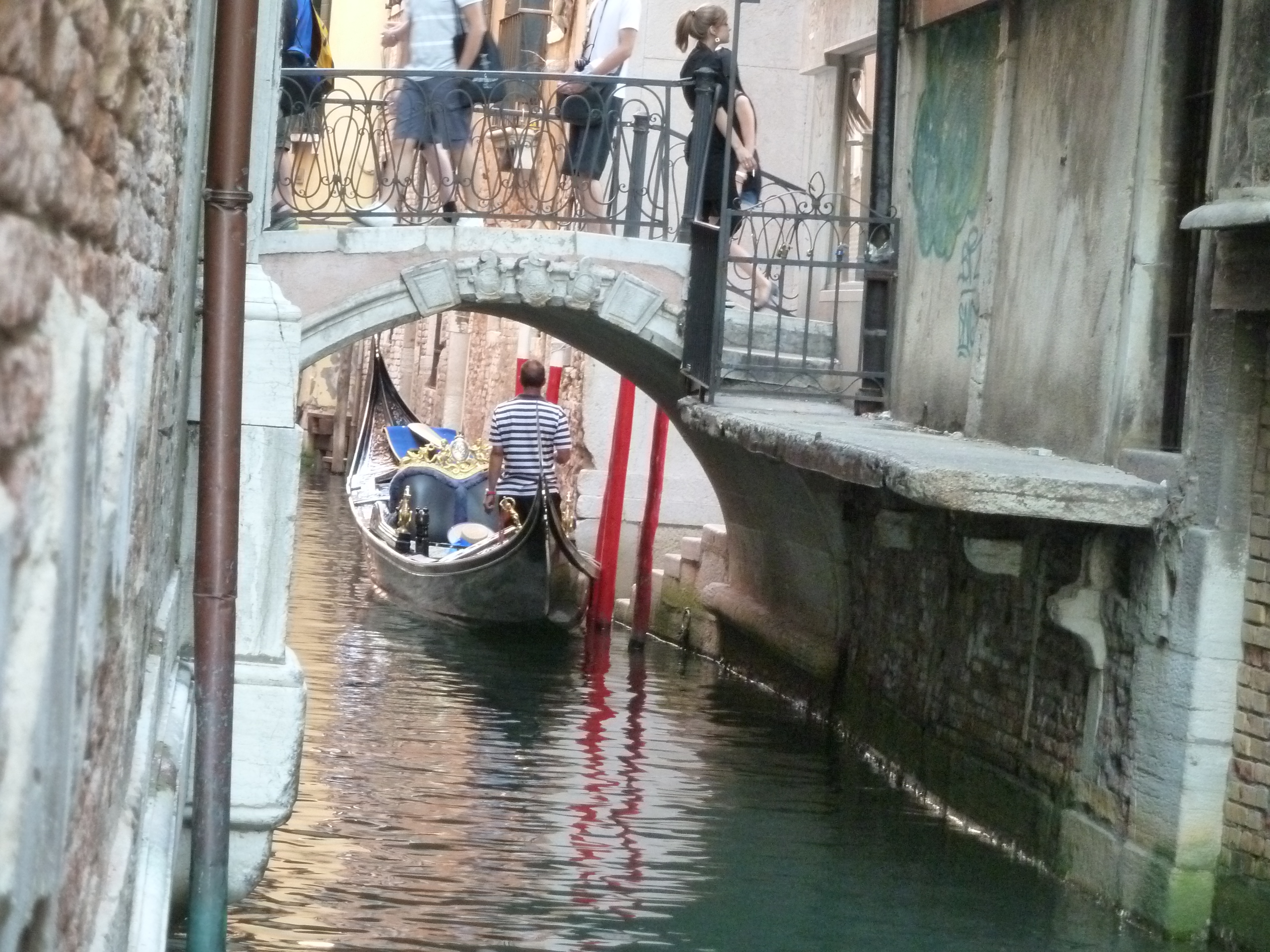
Ponte del Lovo
Rio de San Salvador

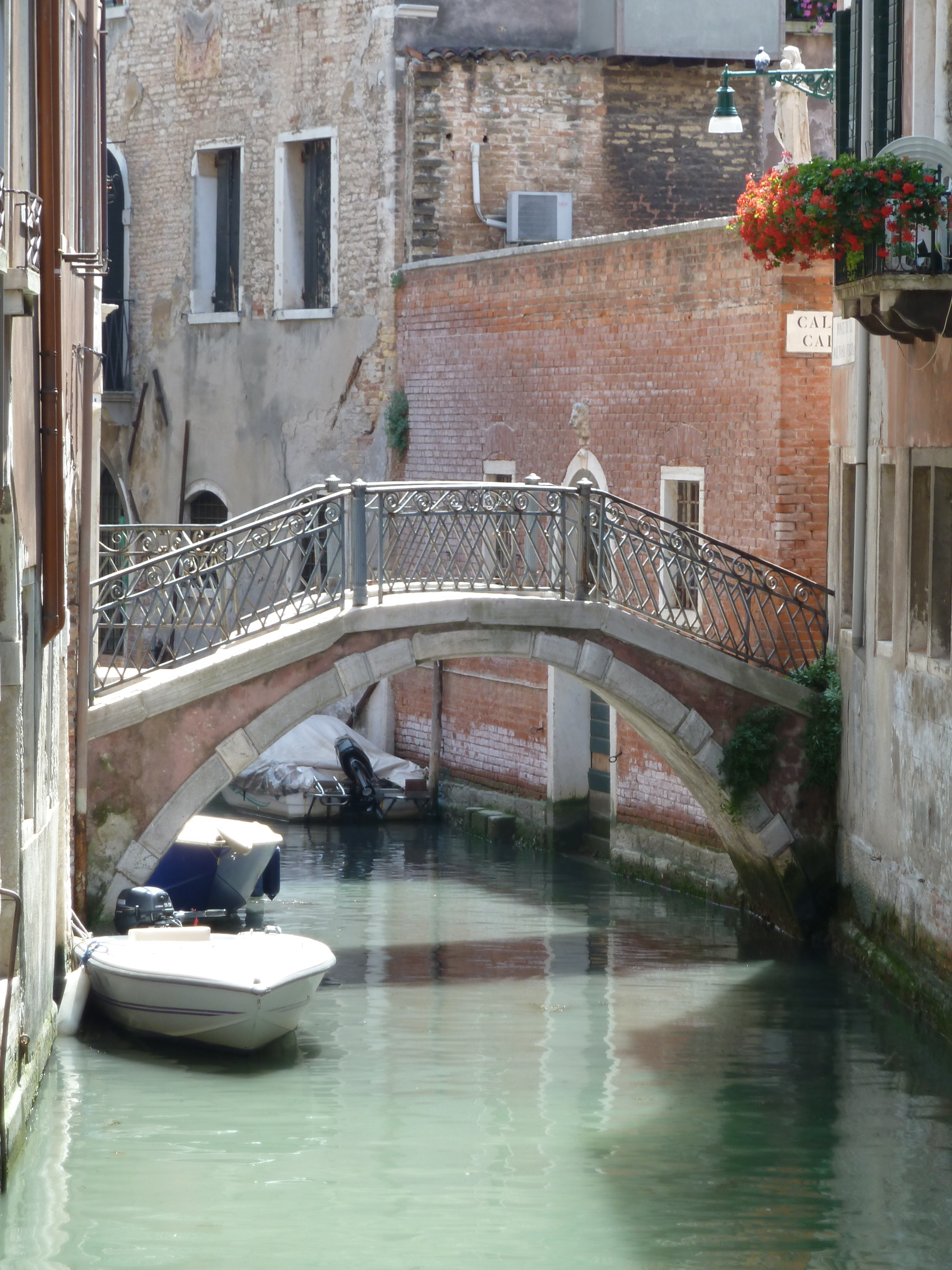
Ponte de la Malvasia Vecchia
Rio de la Verona

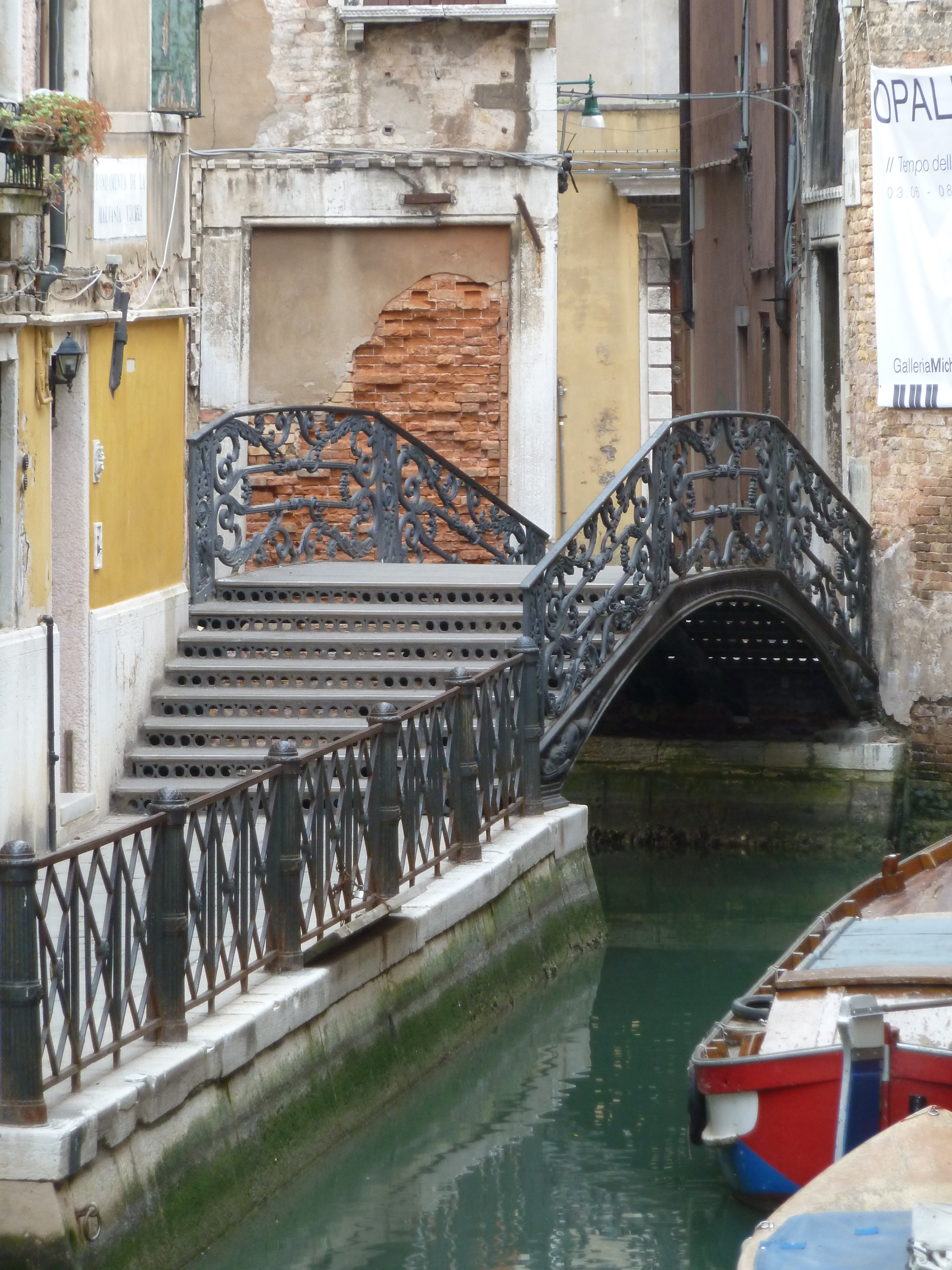
Ponte de la Malvasia Vecchia
Rio de San Maurizio

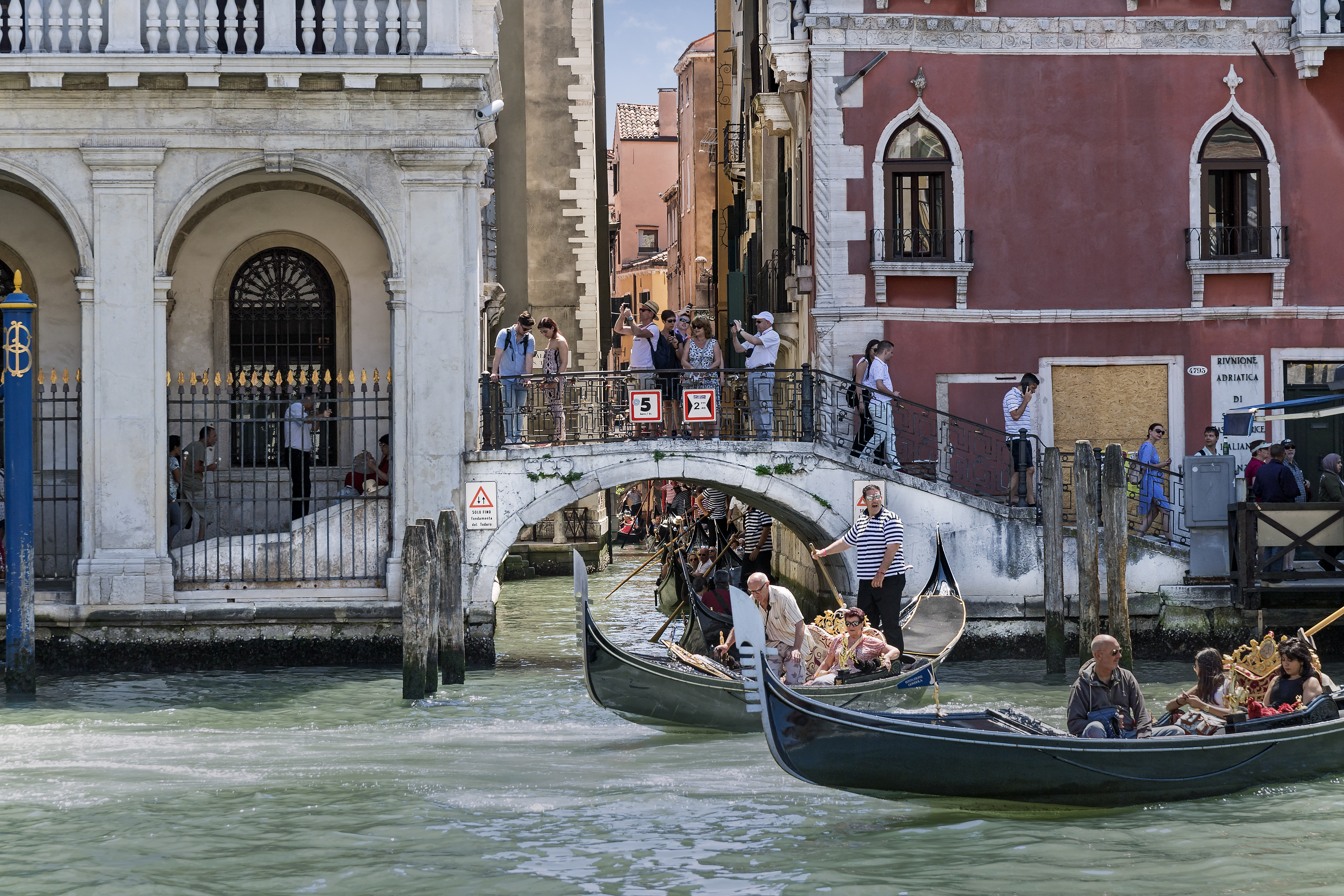
Ponte Manin
Rio de San Salvador

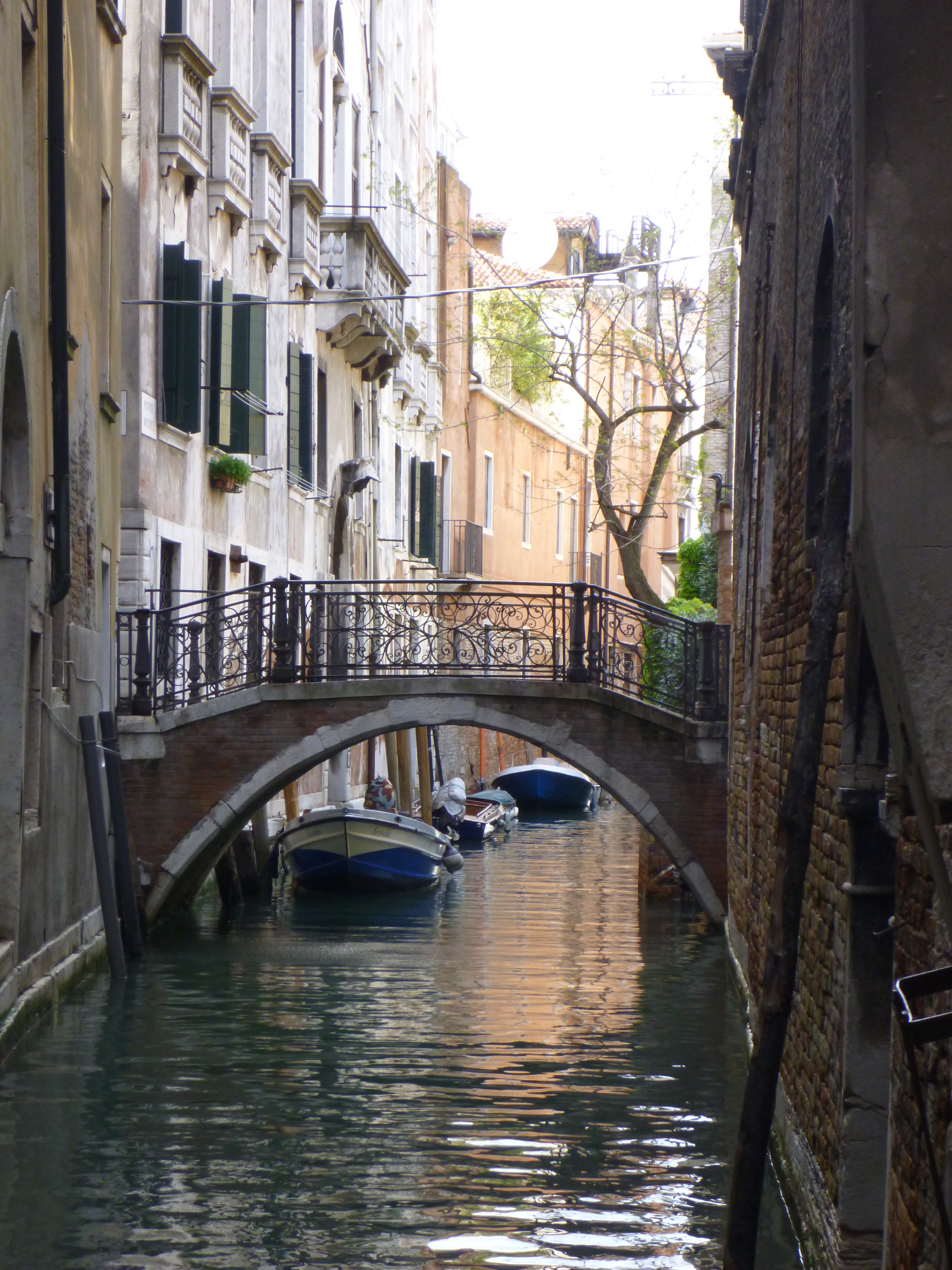
Ponte Michiel
Rio de Ca' Michiel

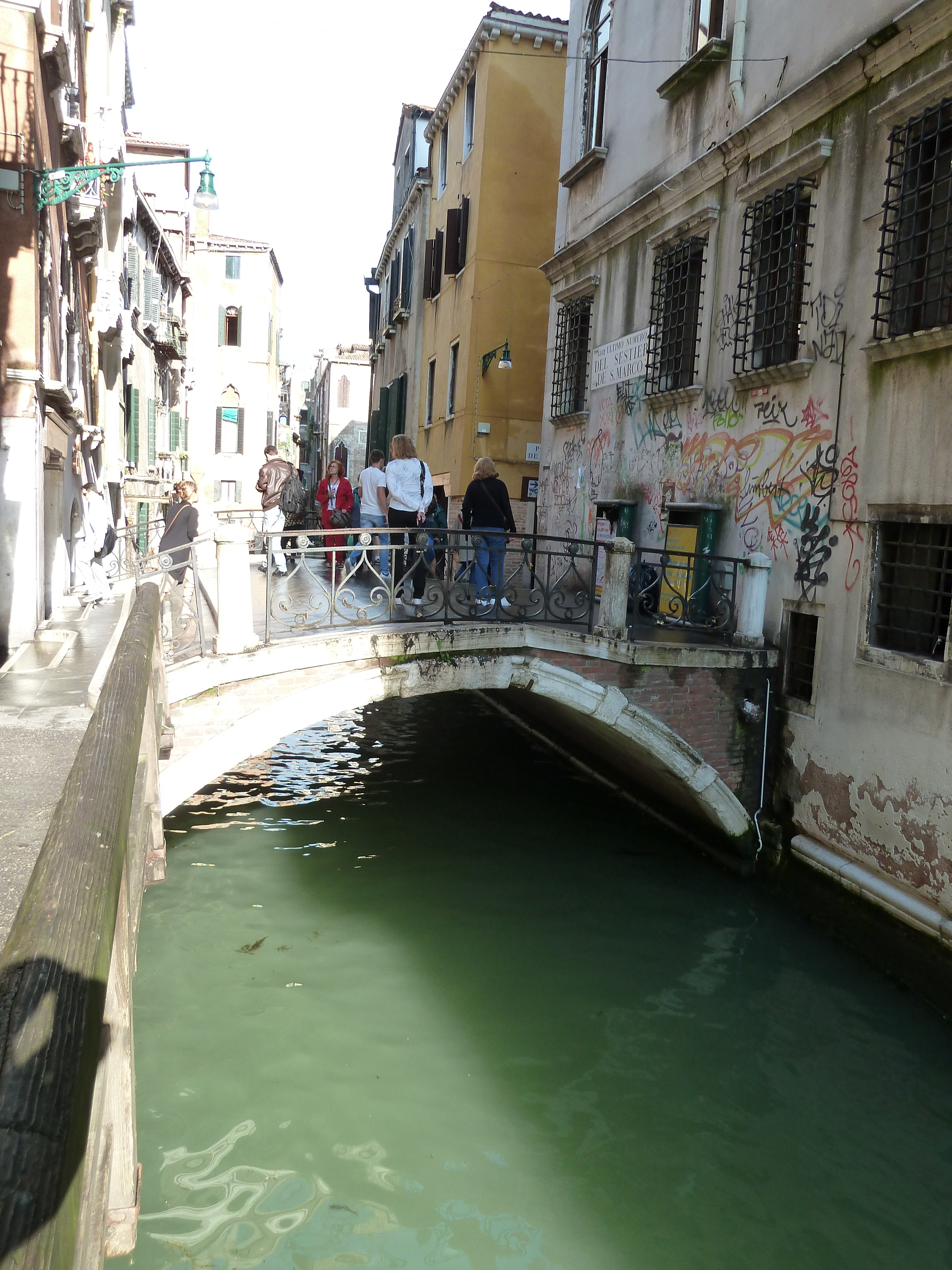
Ponte de l'Ogio (ou dell'Olio)
Font dei Tedeschi

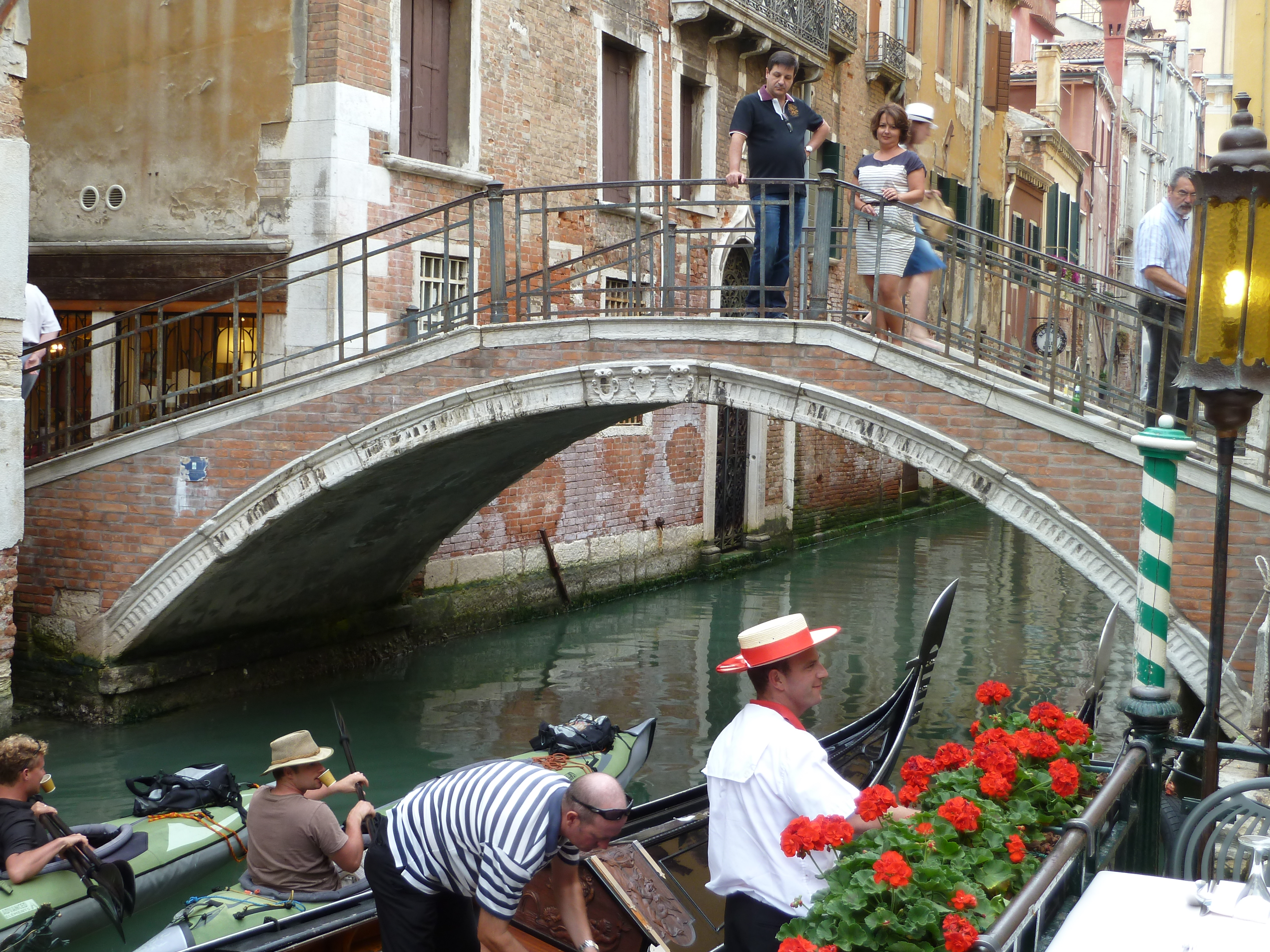
Ponte de le Ostreghe
Rio de l’Alboro

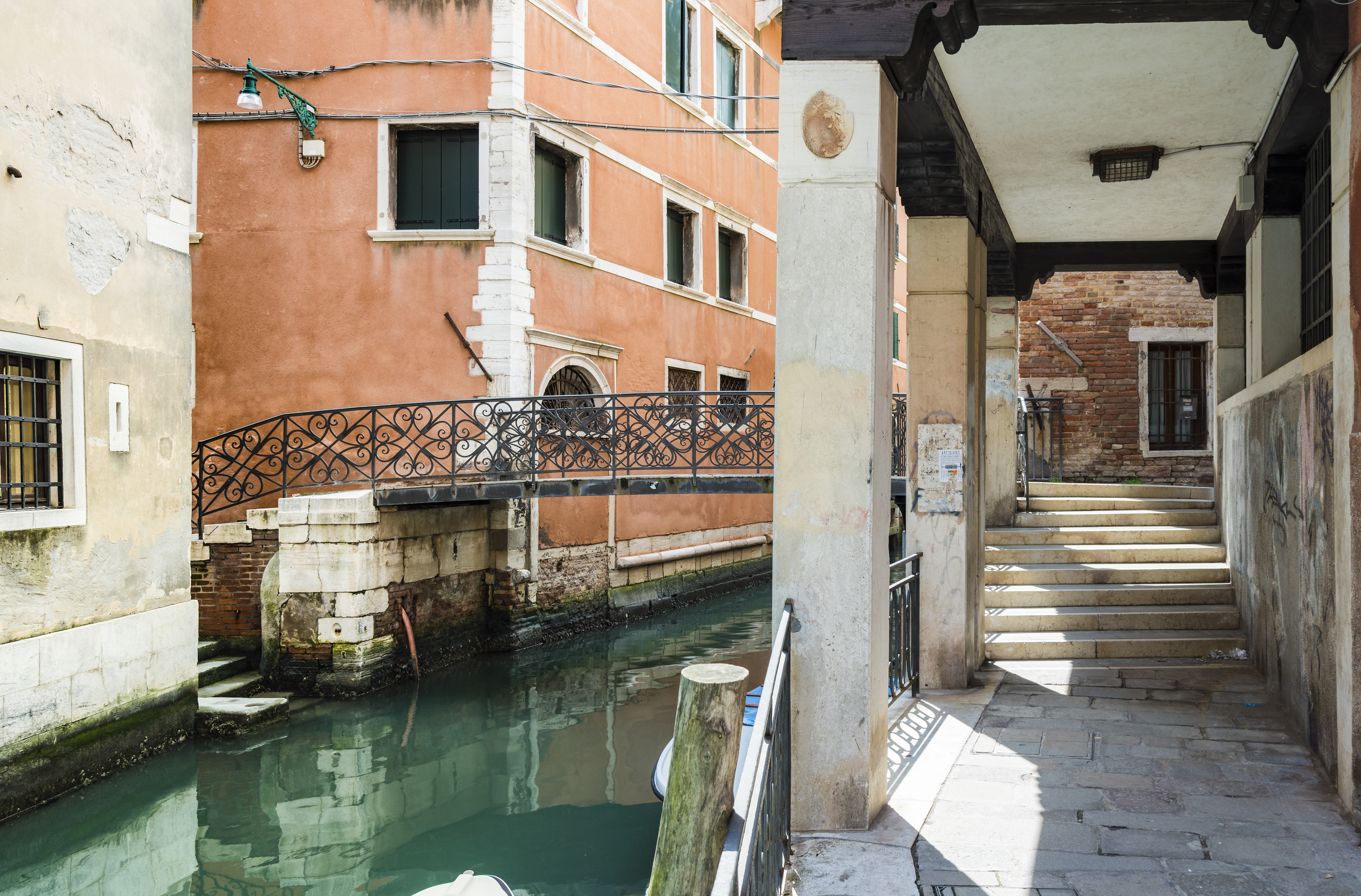
Ponte del Pestrin
Rio de San Anzolo

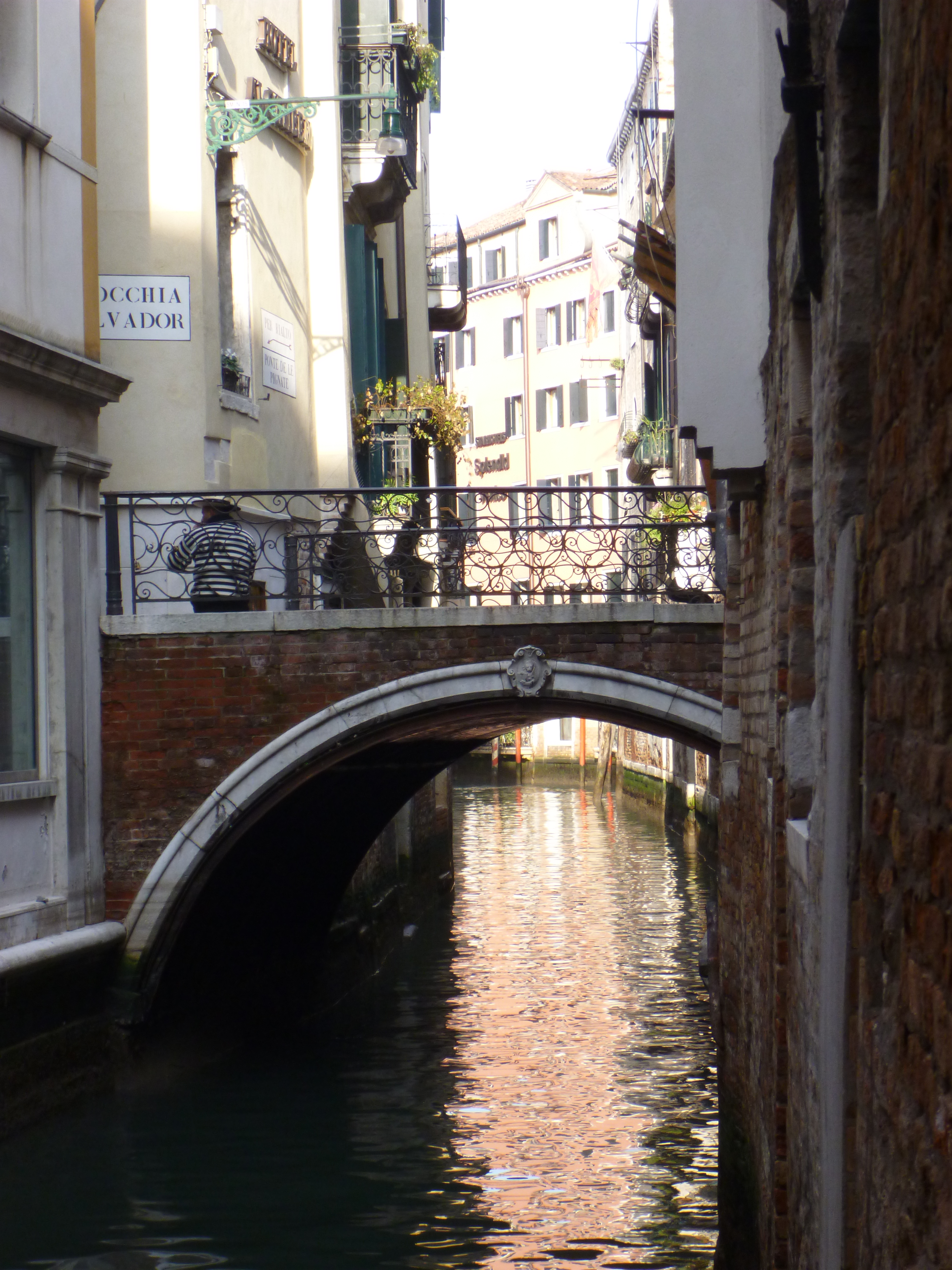
Ponte de le Pignate
Rio dei Scoacamini

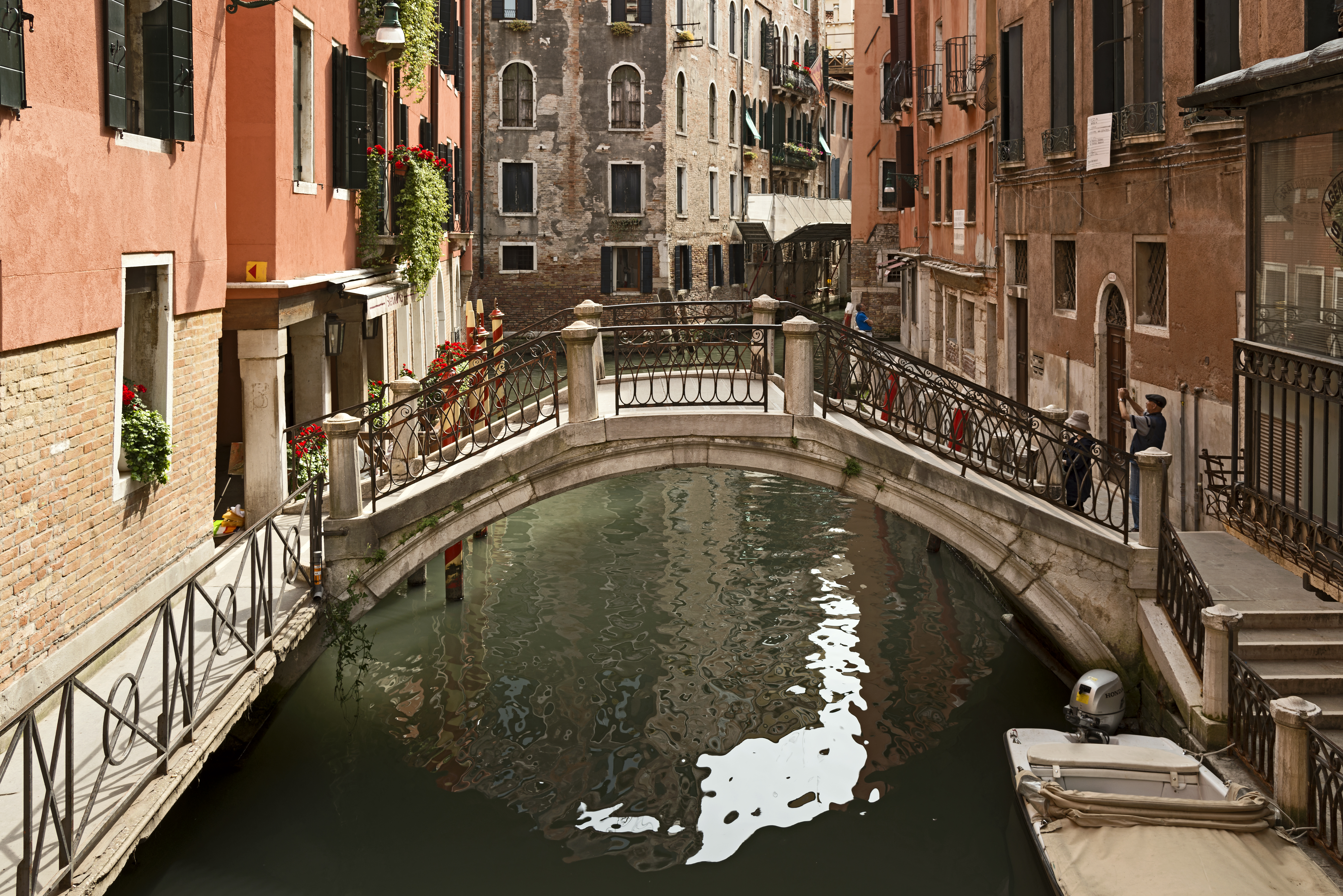
Ponte dei Pignoli
Rio dei Bareteri

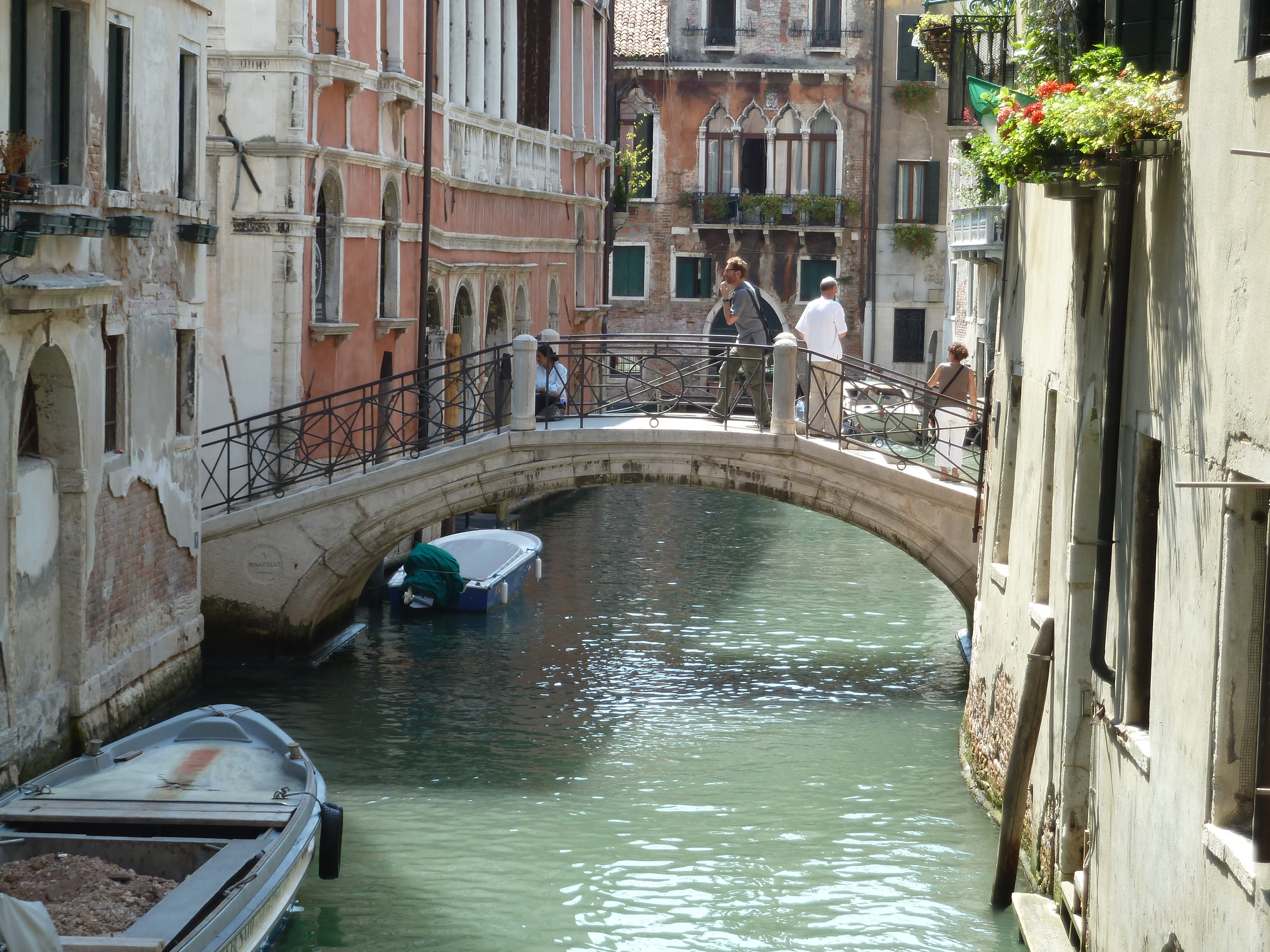
Ponte de la Piscina di Frezzaria
Rio dei Barcaroli

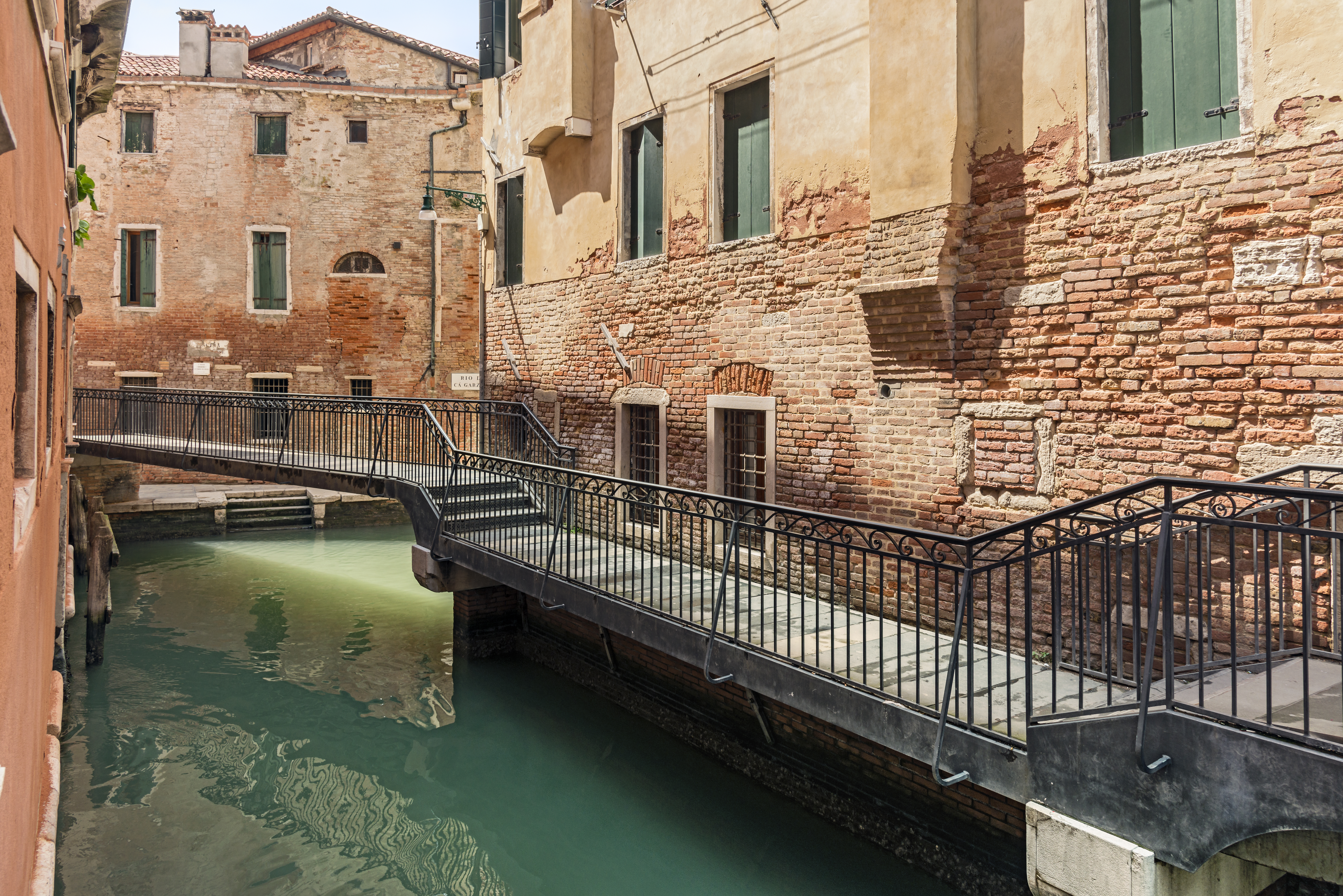
Ponte Piscina San Samuele
Rio del Pestrin

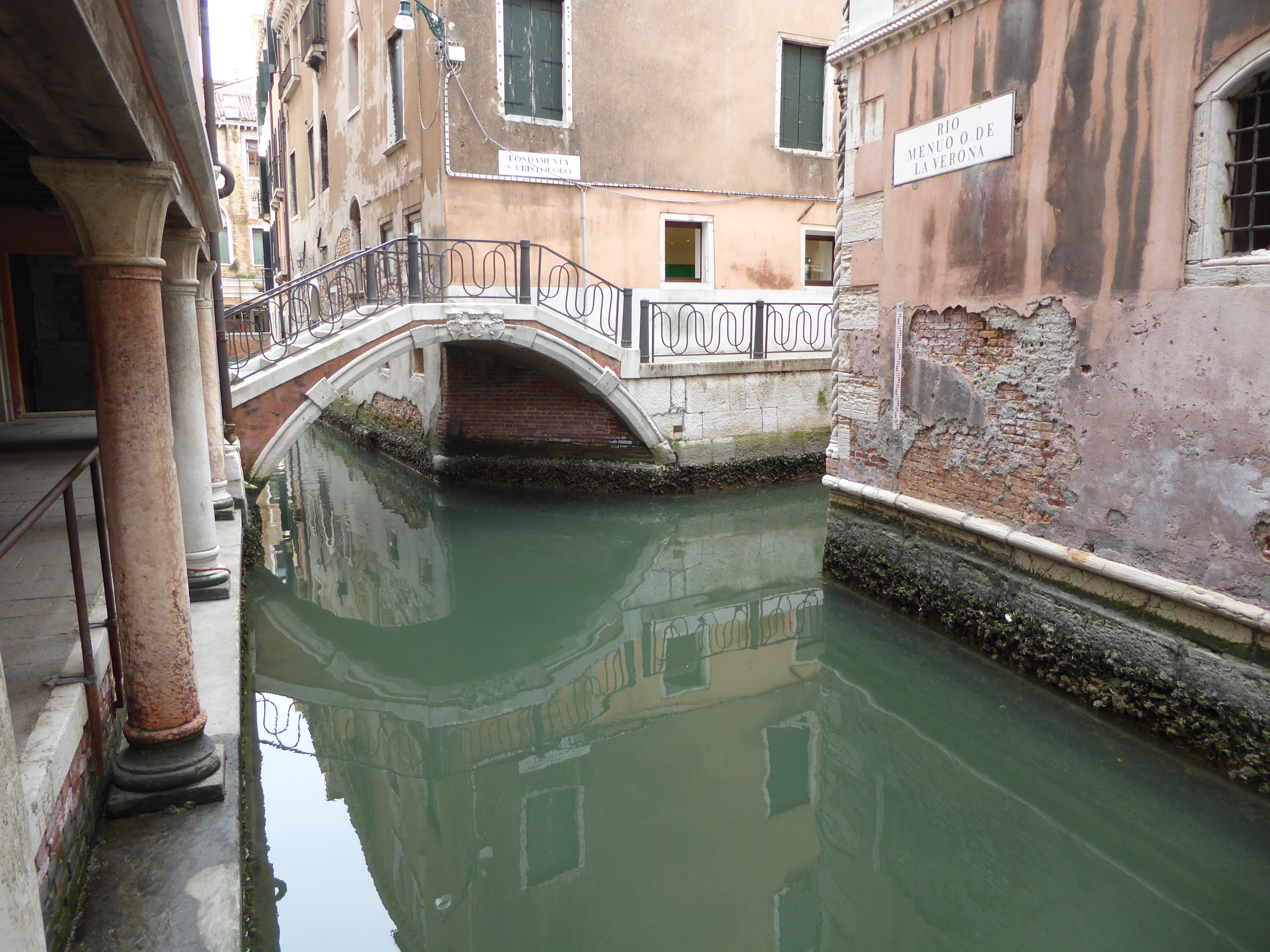
Ponte San Cristoforo
Rio delle Veste

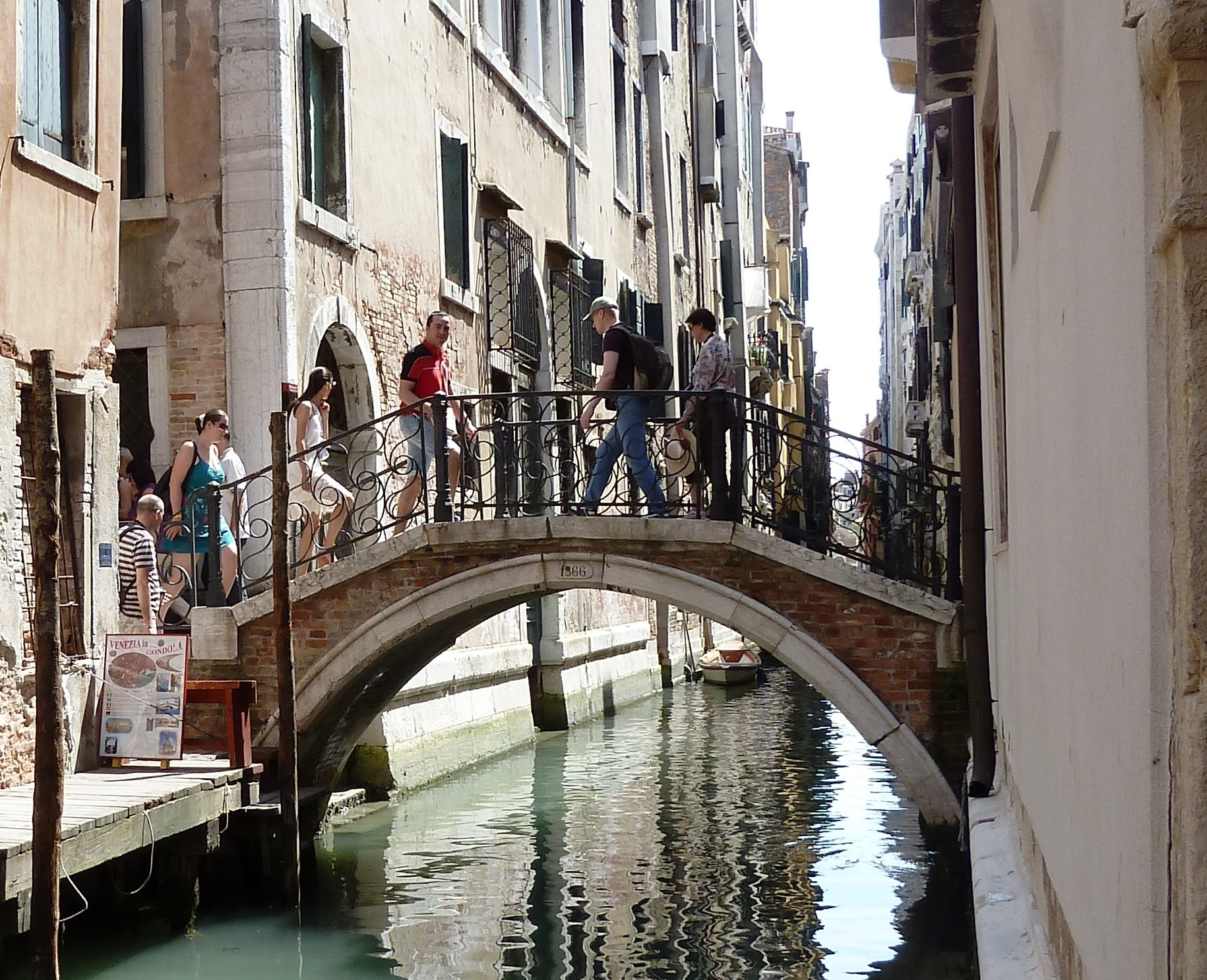
Ponte San Maurizio
Rio di Santo Stefano

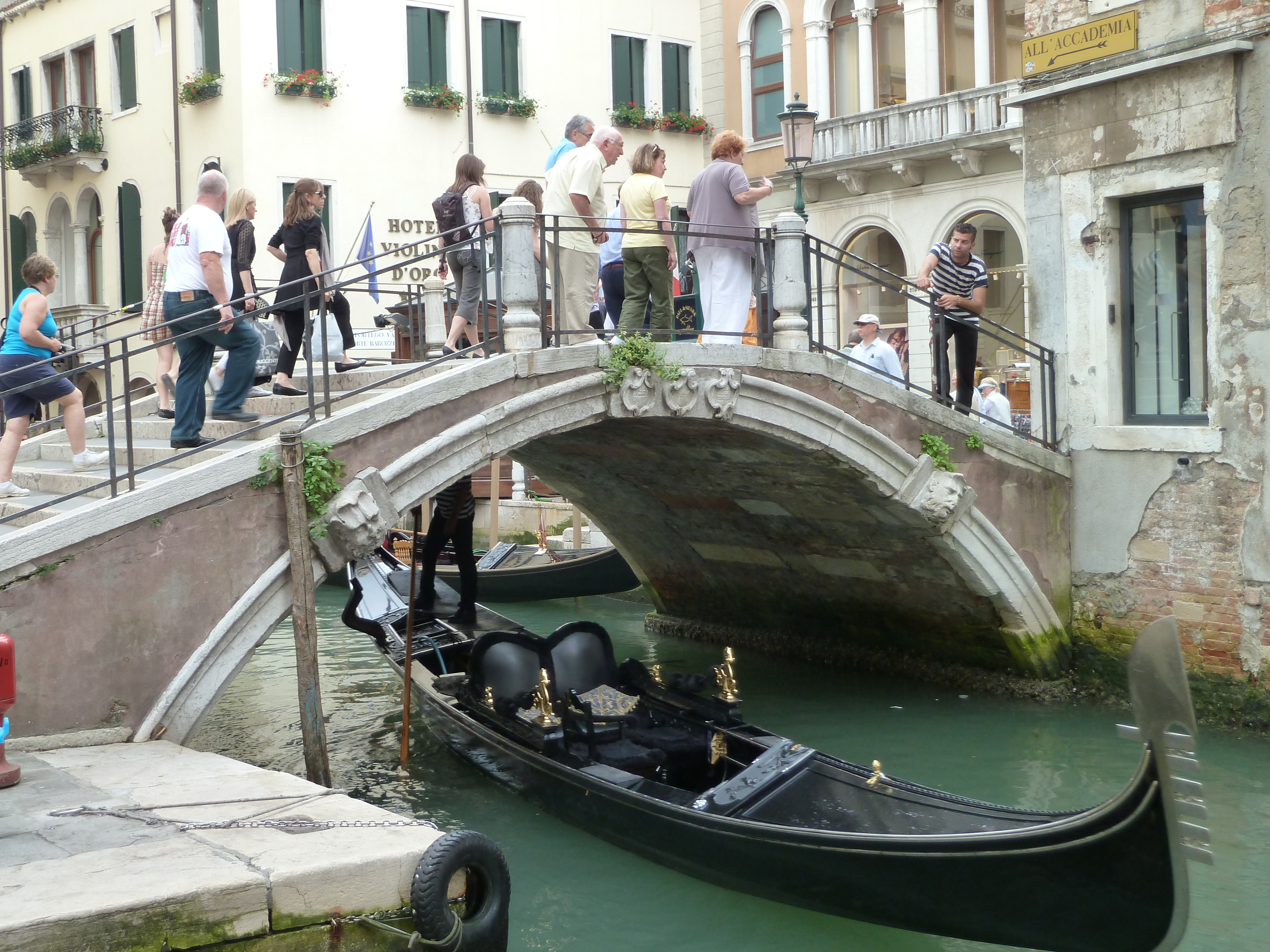
Ponte San Moisè
Rio de San Moisè

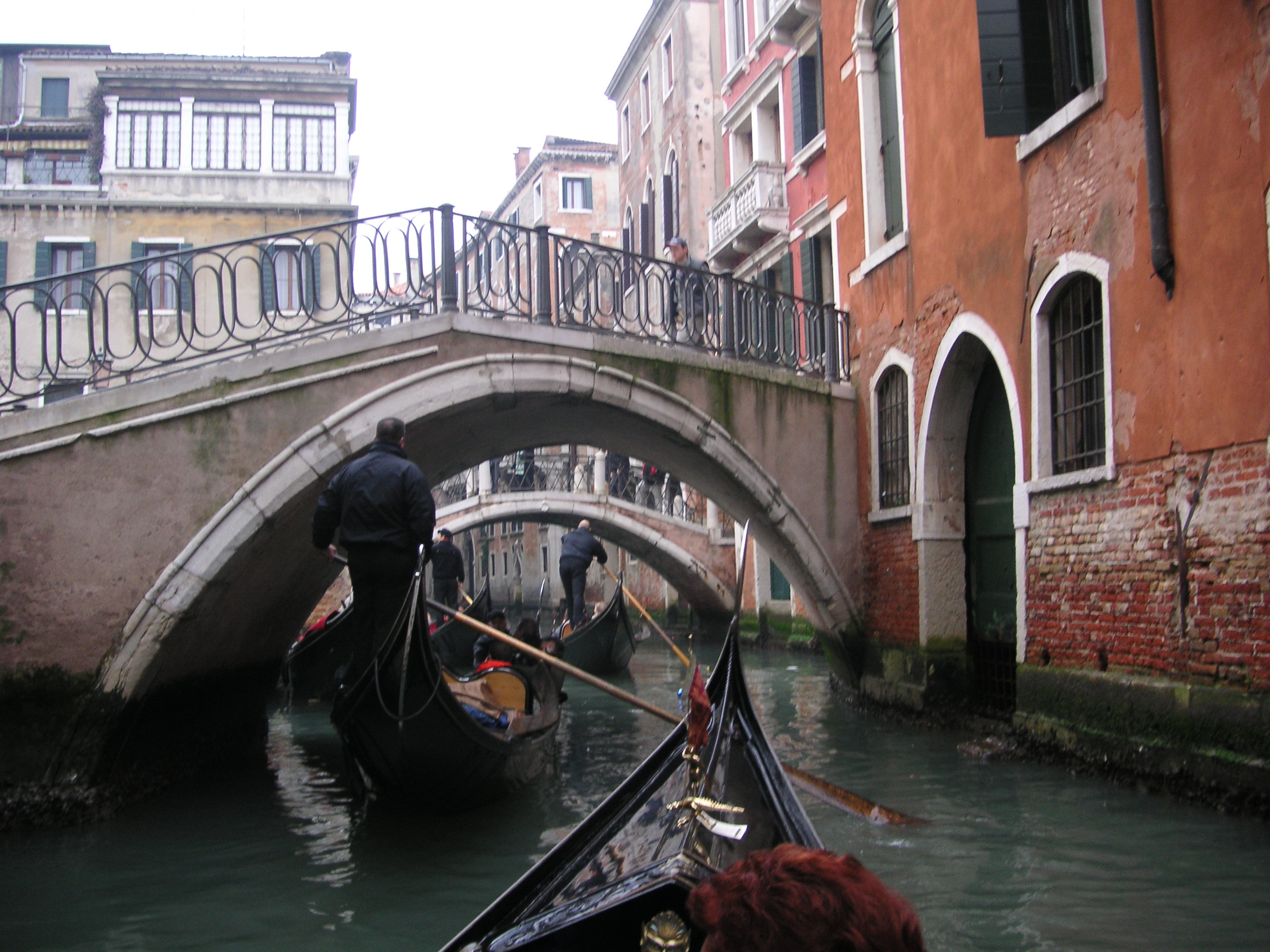
Ponte San Paternian
Rio de San Luca

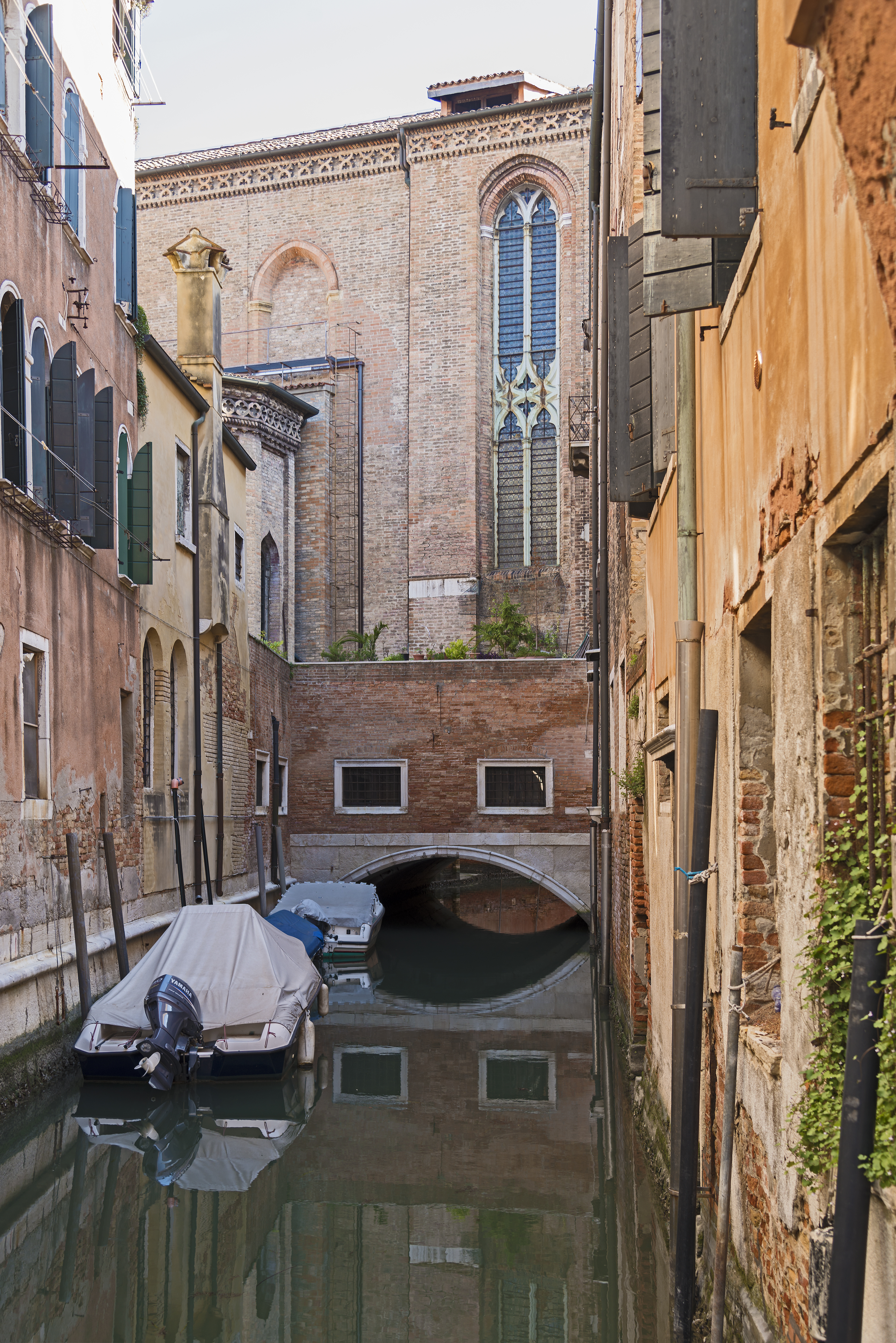
Ponte sotto San Stefano
Rio del Santissimo di Santo Stefano

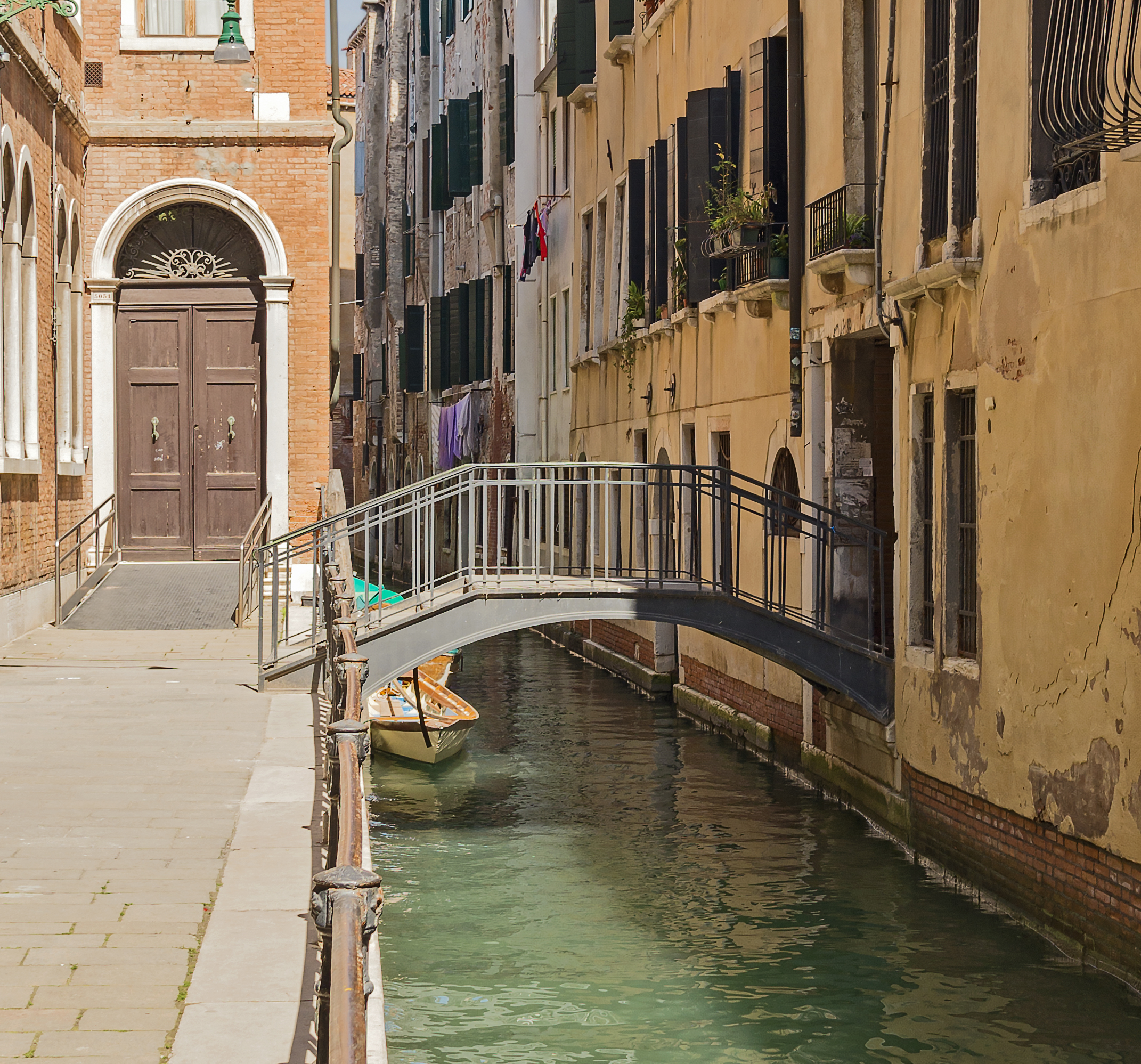
Ponte de le Scuole
Rio del Duca

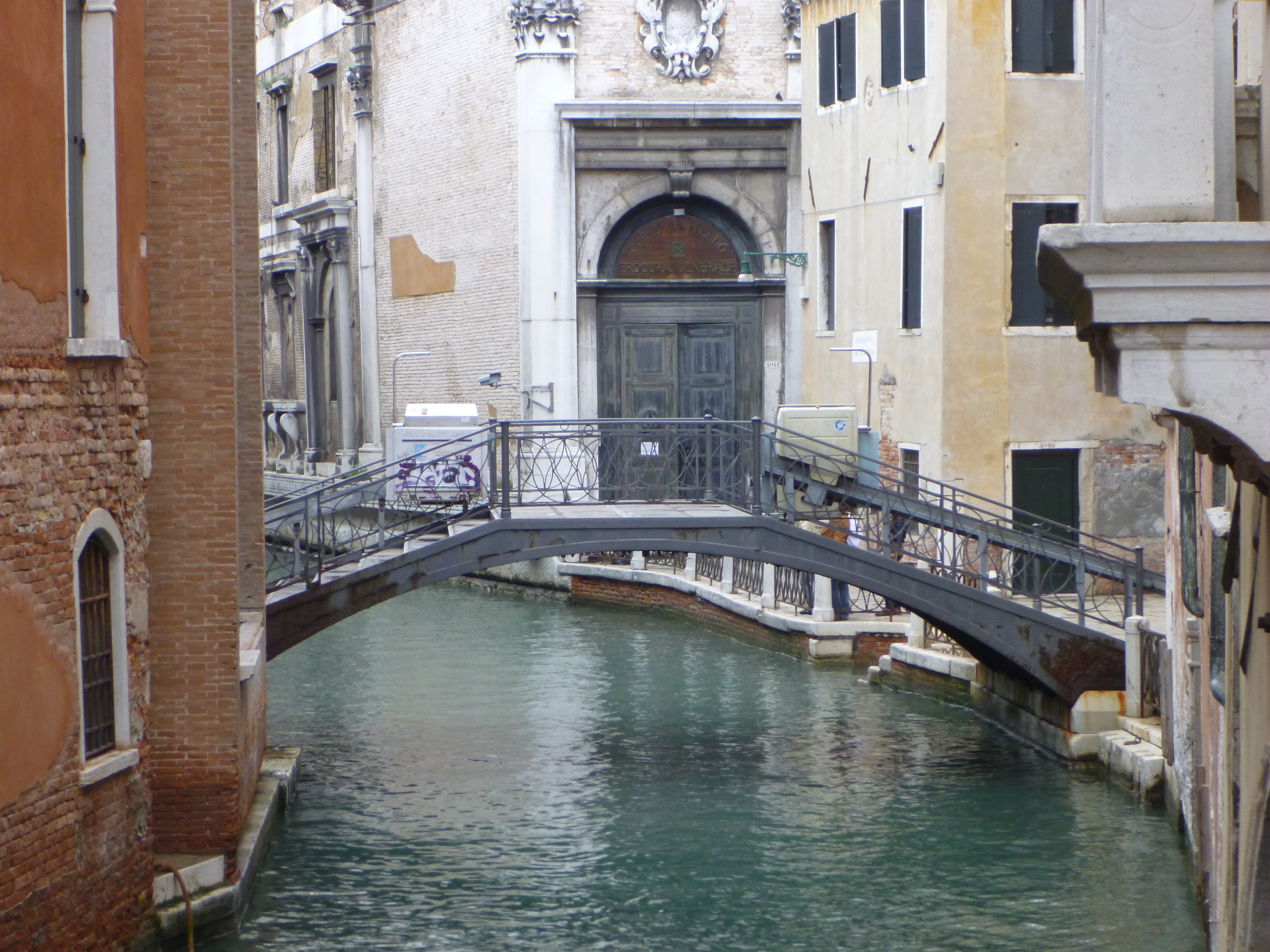
Ponte del Teatro
Rio de San Luca

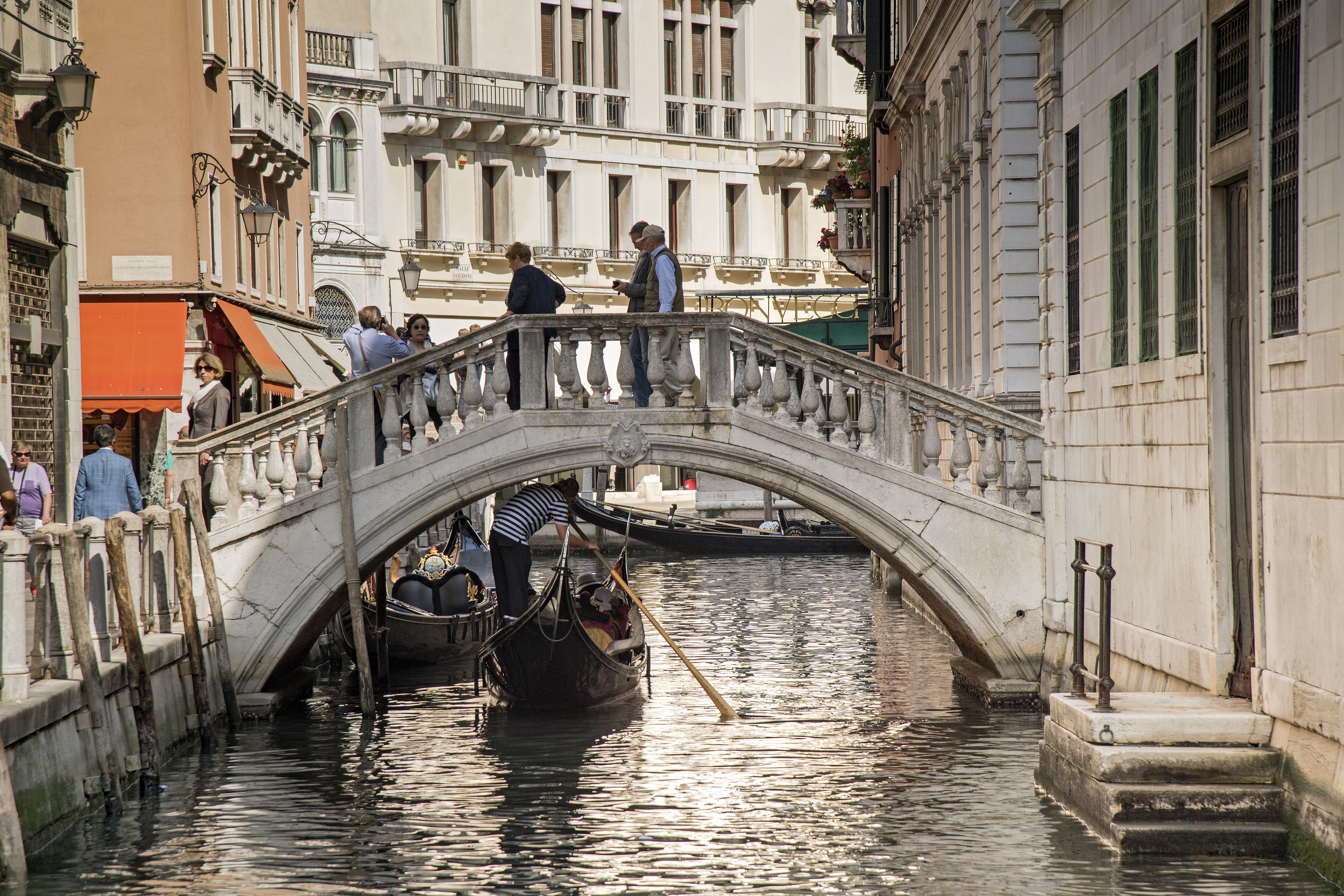
Ponte Tron o de la Piavola
Rio Orseolo

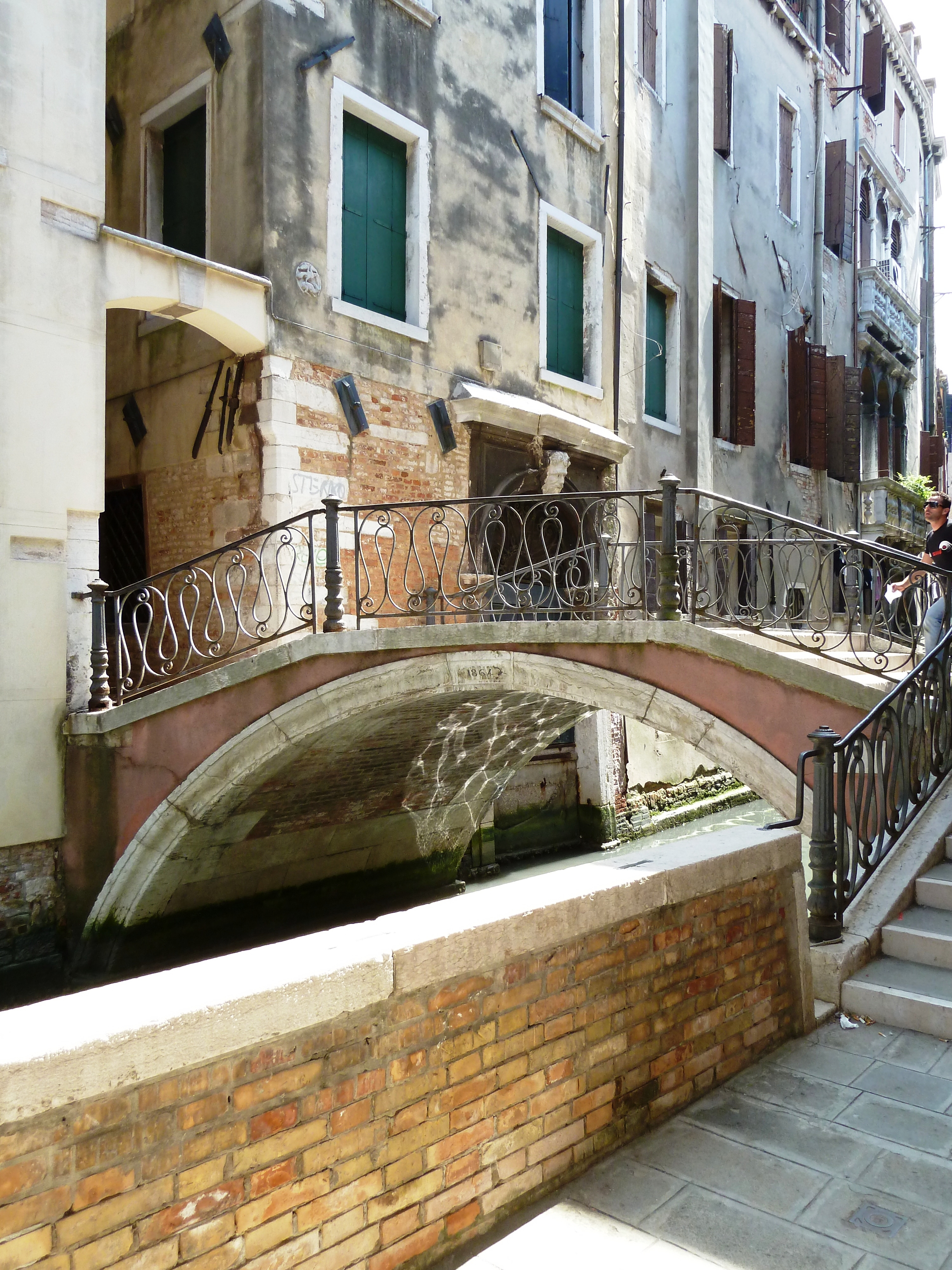
Ponte de la Verona
Rio de la Verona

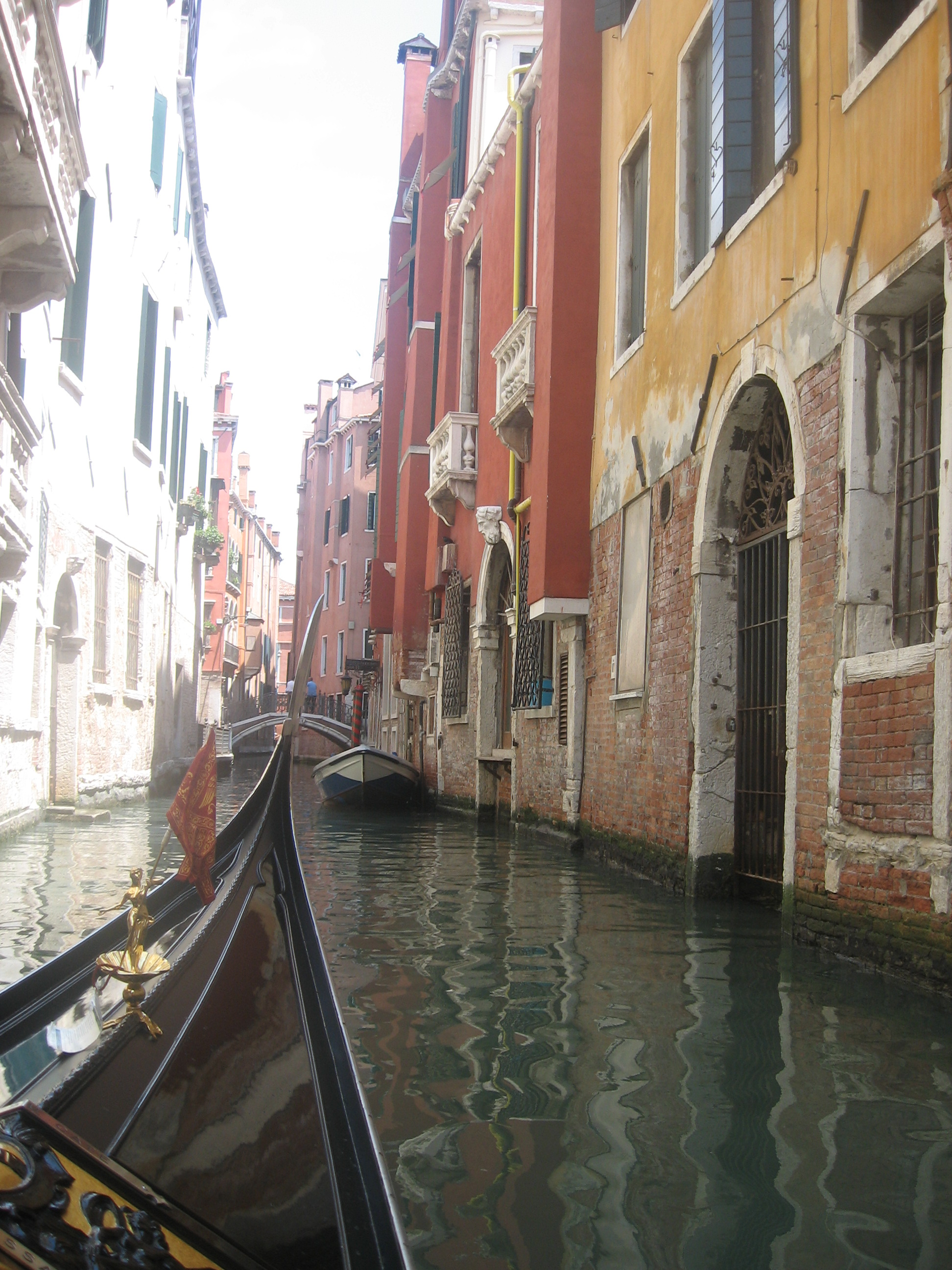
Ponte de le Veste
Rio delle Veste

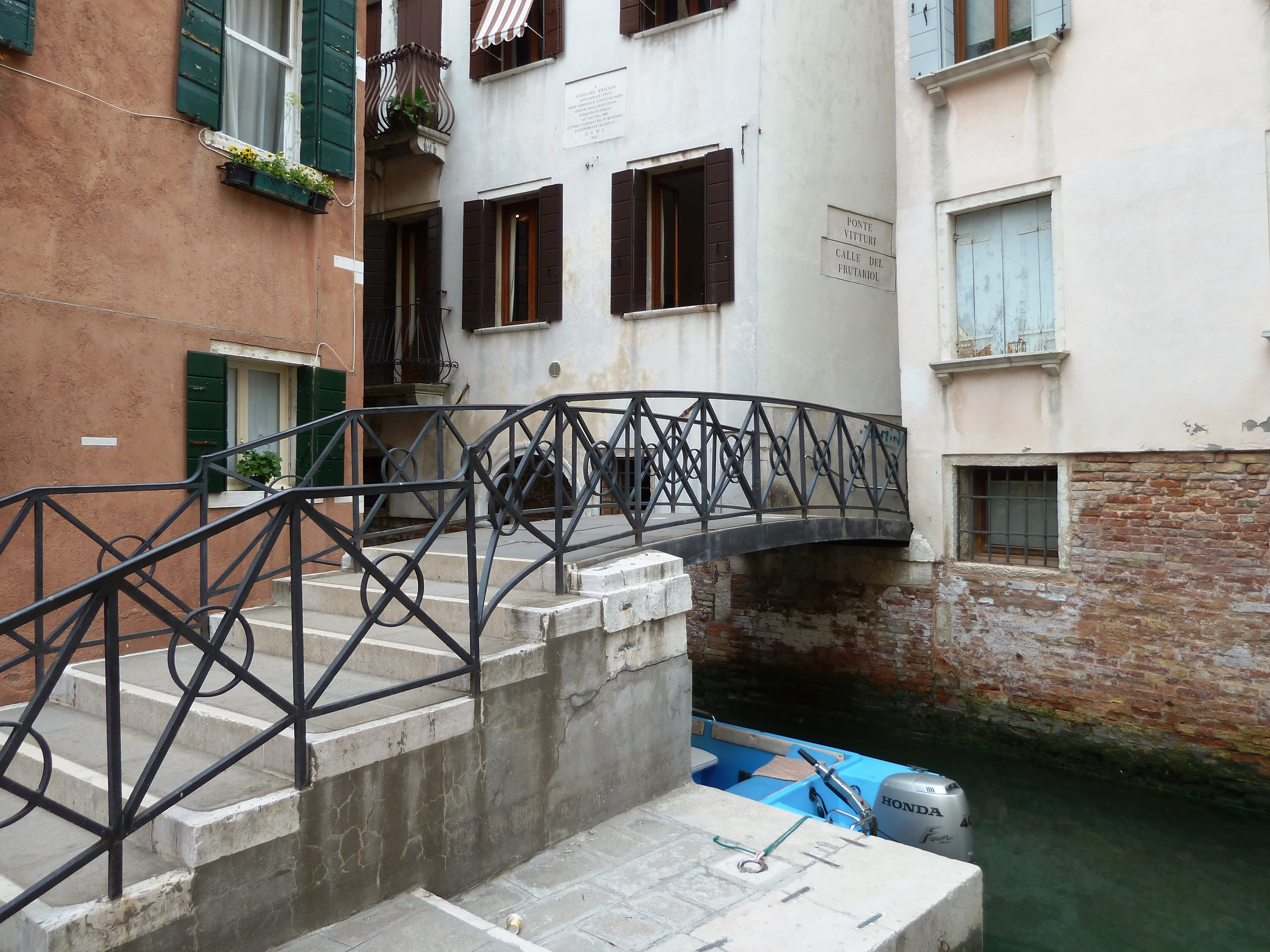
Ponte Vitturi
Rio de San Vidal

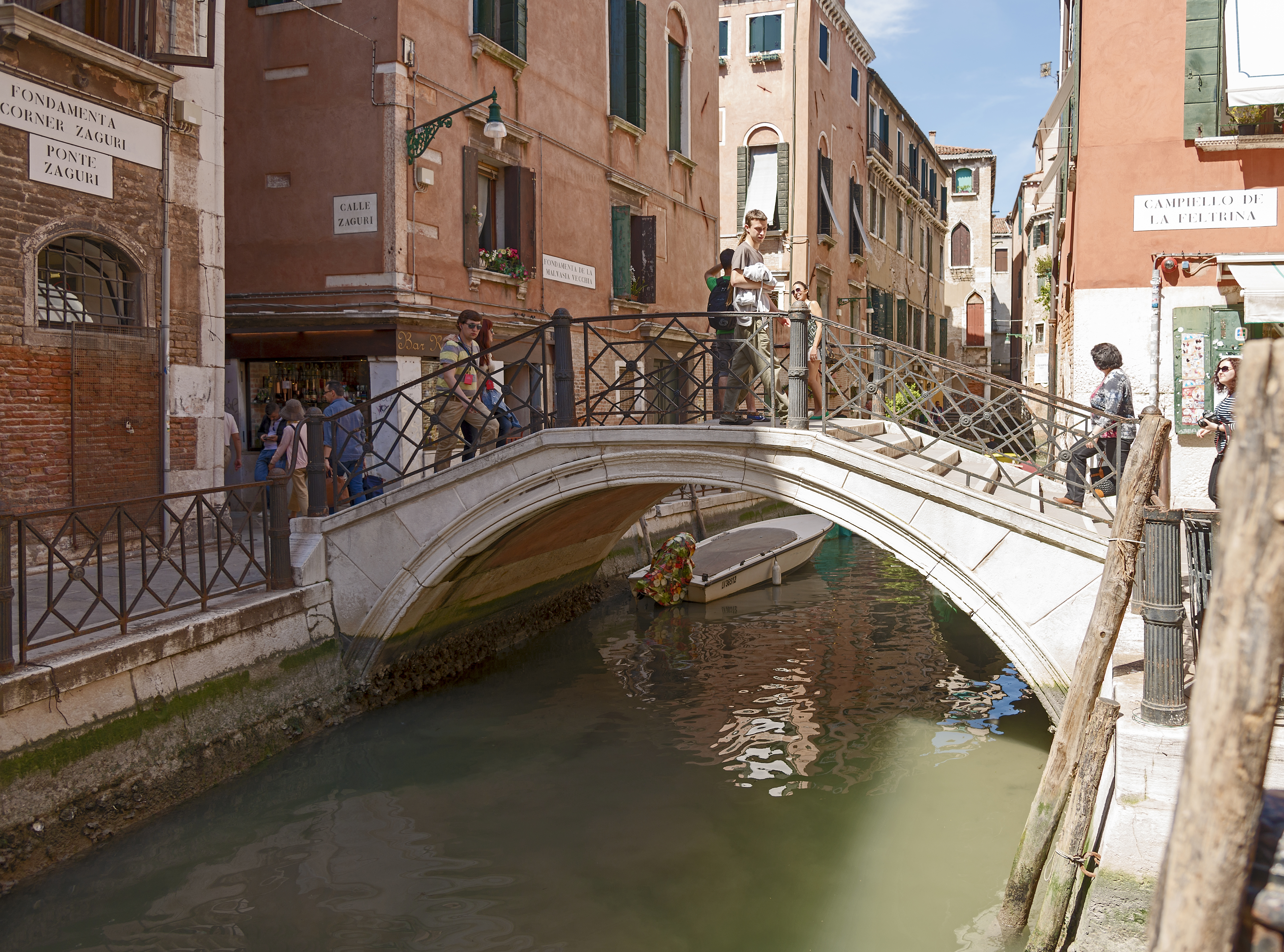
Ponte Zaguri
Rio de San Maurizio
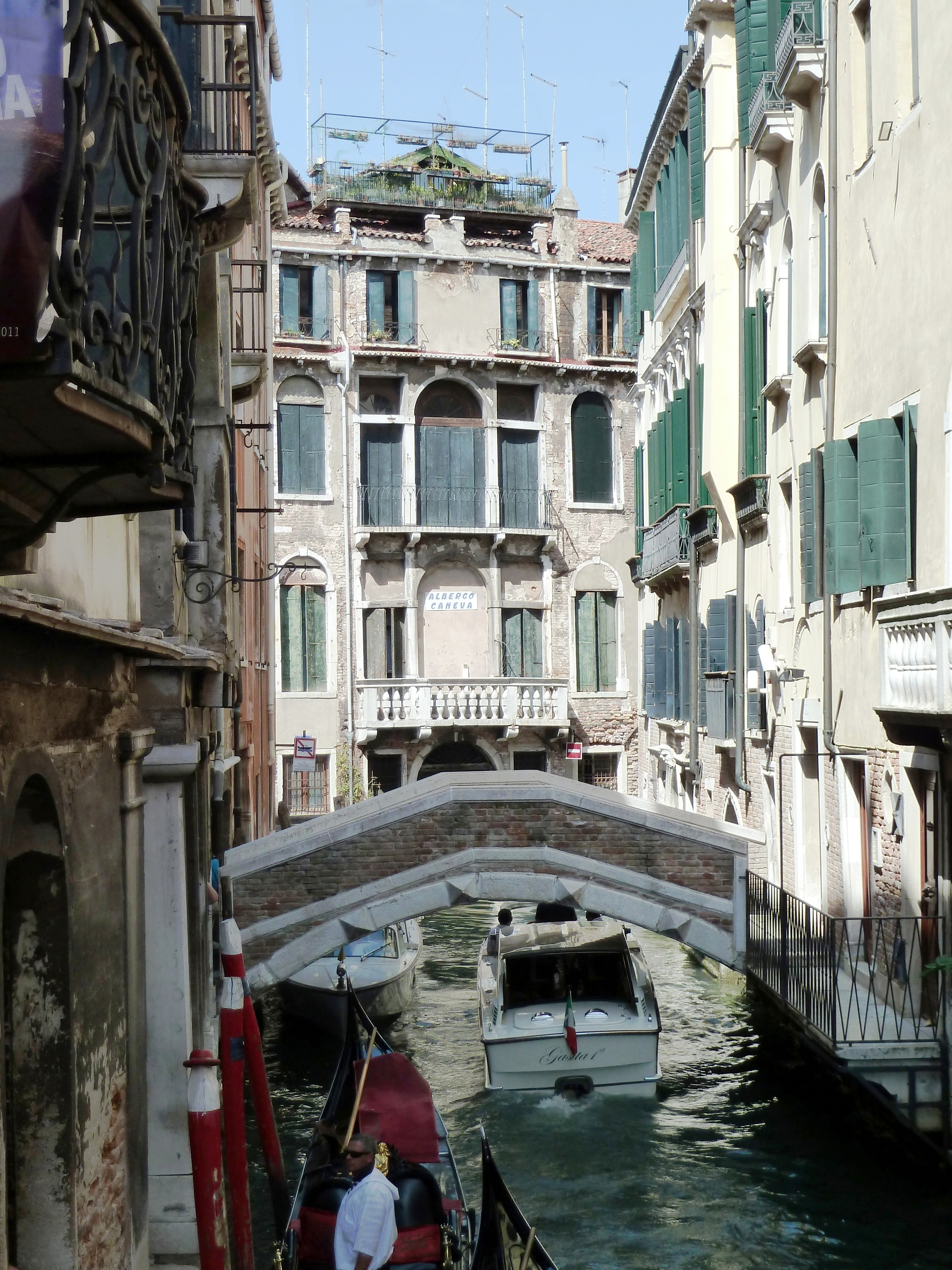
Private bridge over the rio dei Bareteri

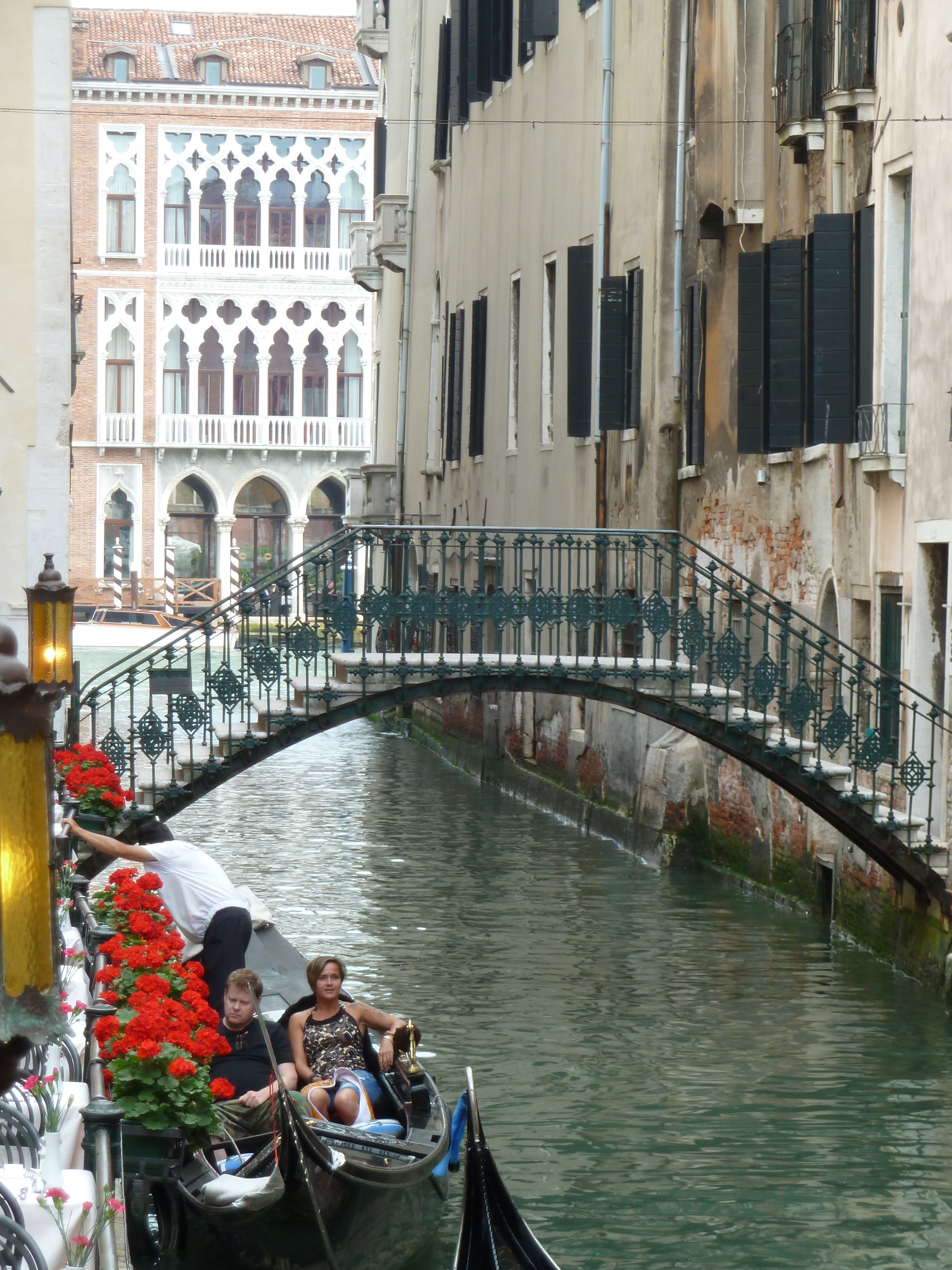
Private bridge over the rio de l'Alboro

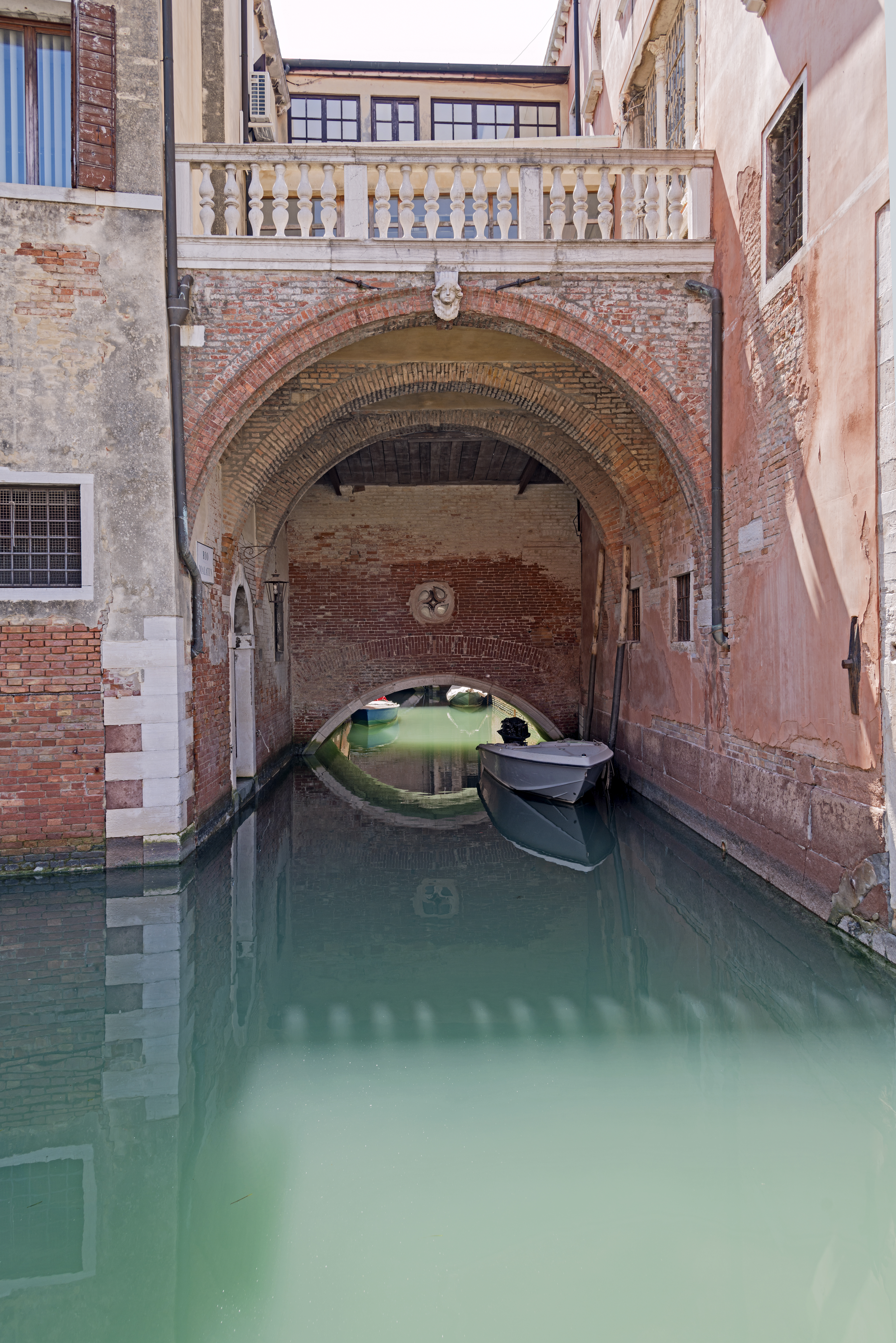
Private bridge of the Santo Stefano rio de San Anzolo

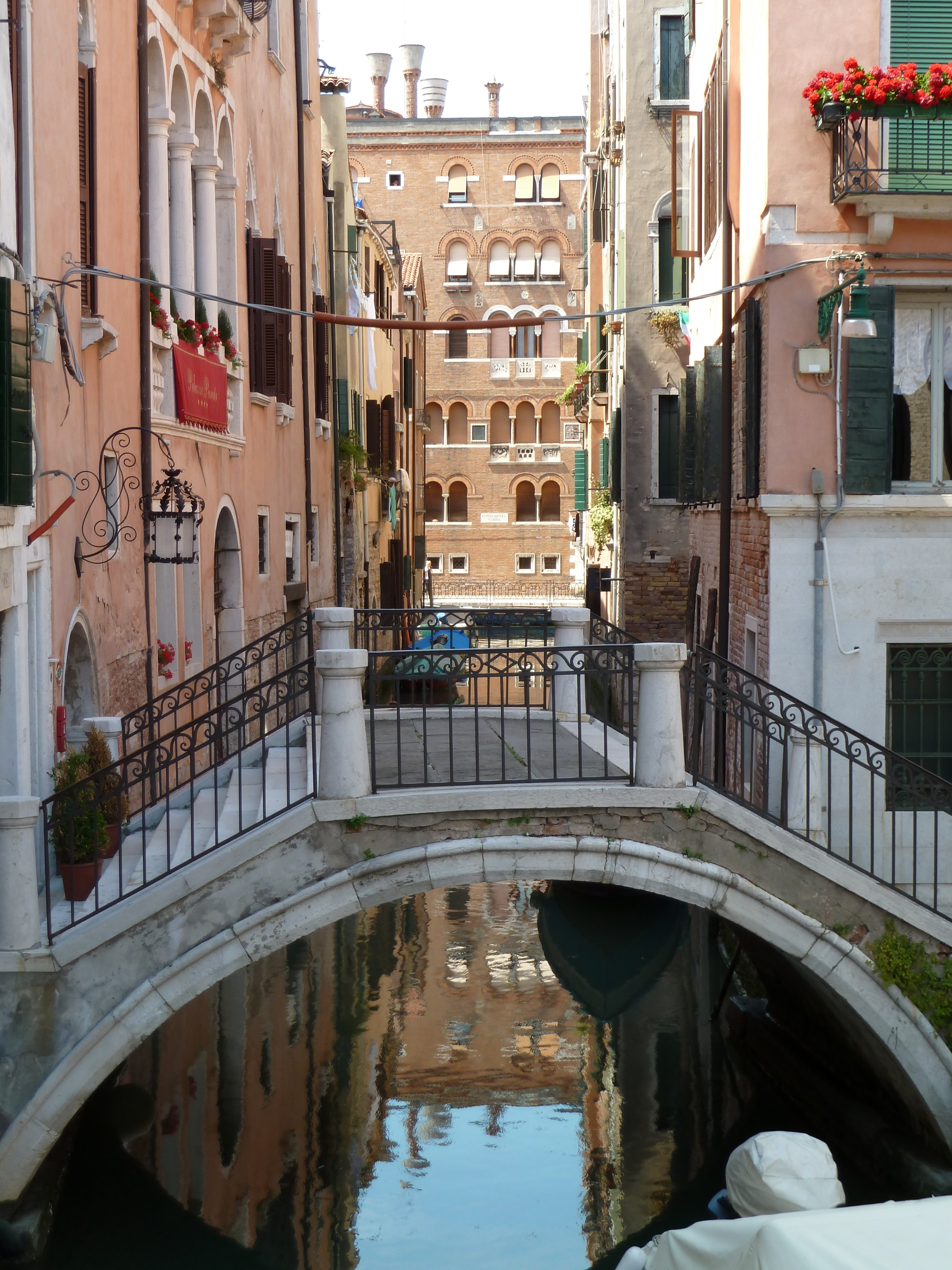
Private bridge over the rio de San Anzolo

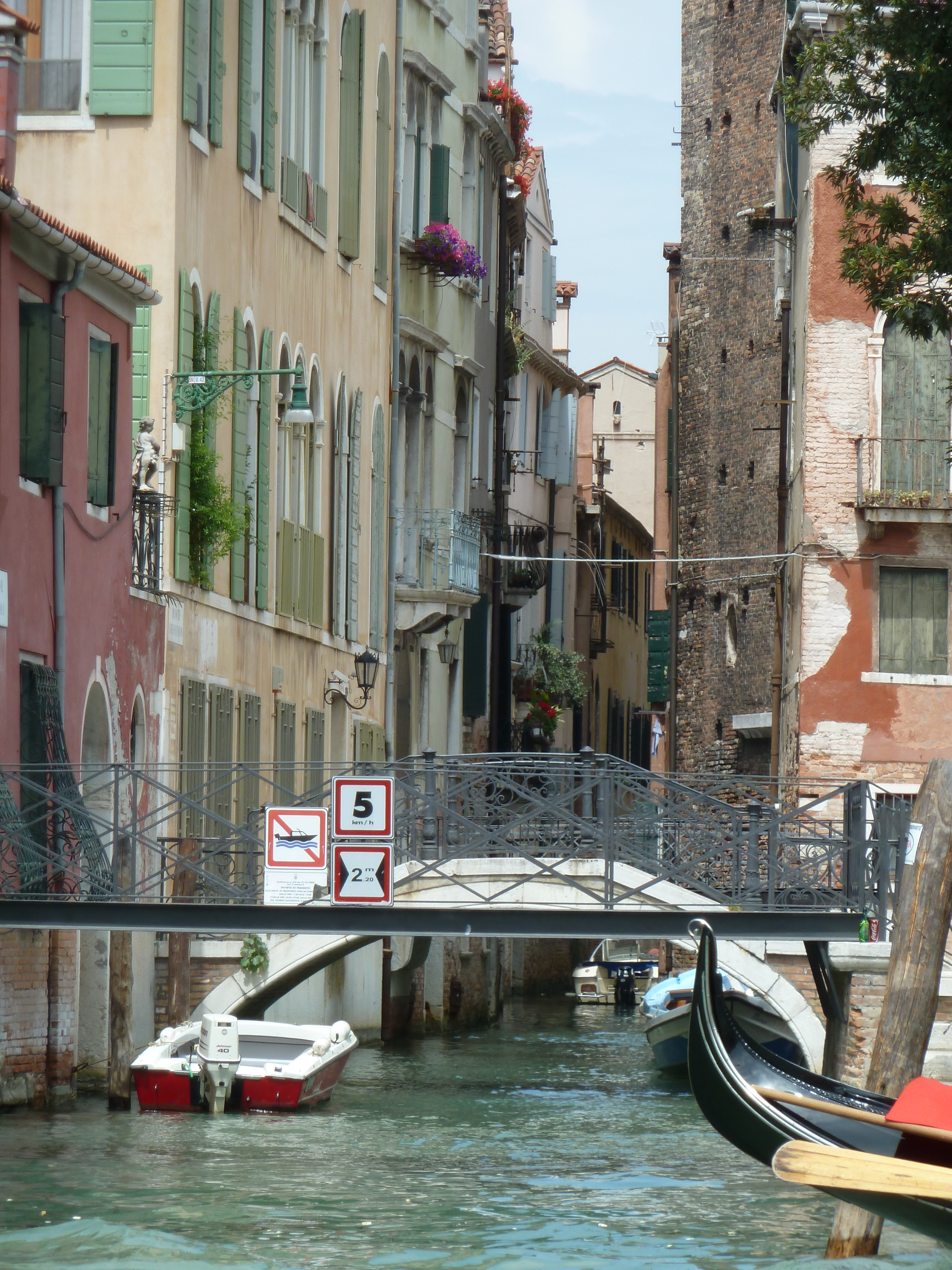
Private bridge over the rio de San Vidal

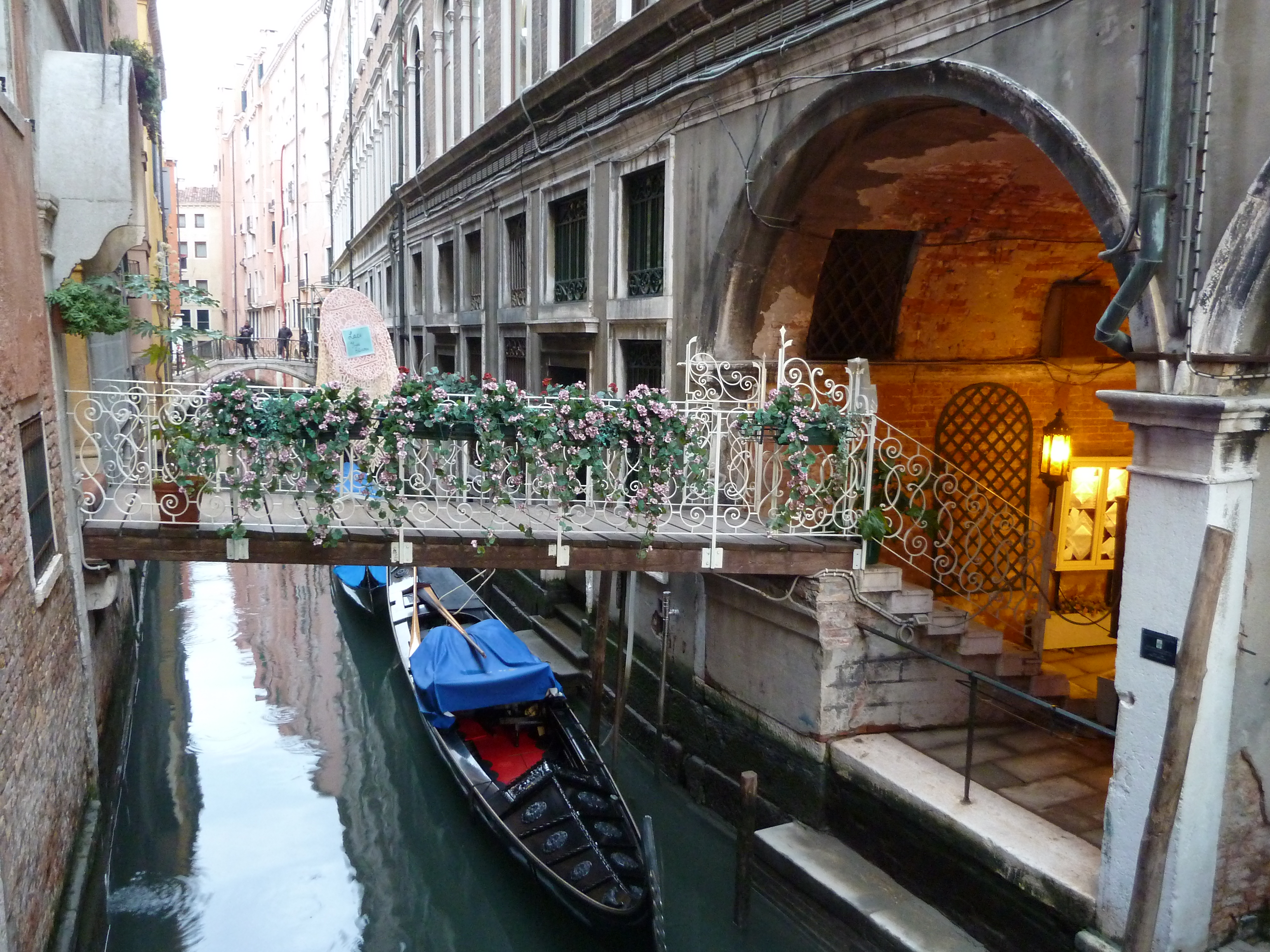
Private bridge over the rio delle Procuratie

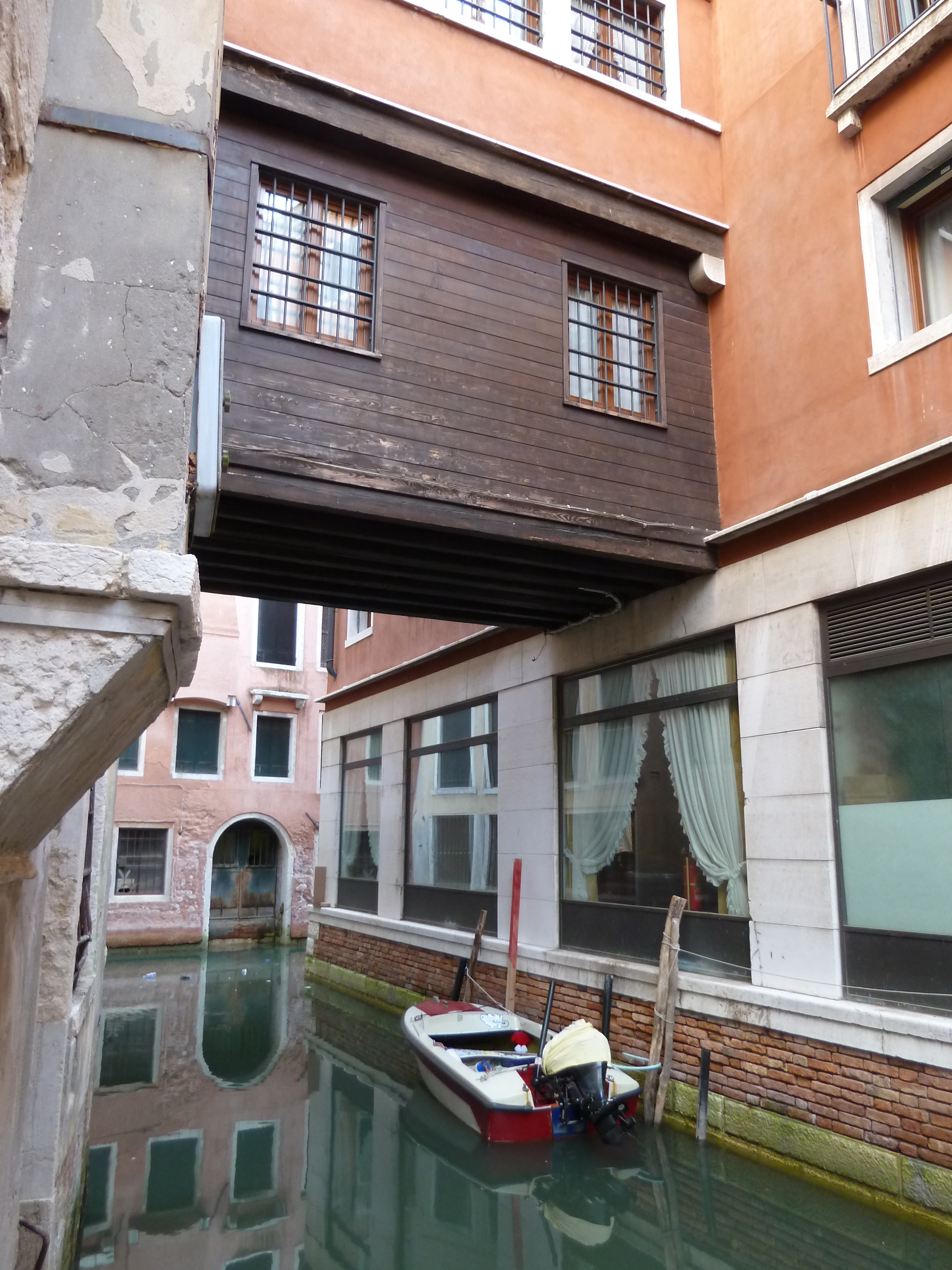
Private bridge over the rio Cappello

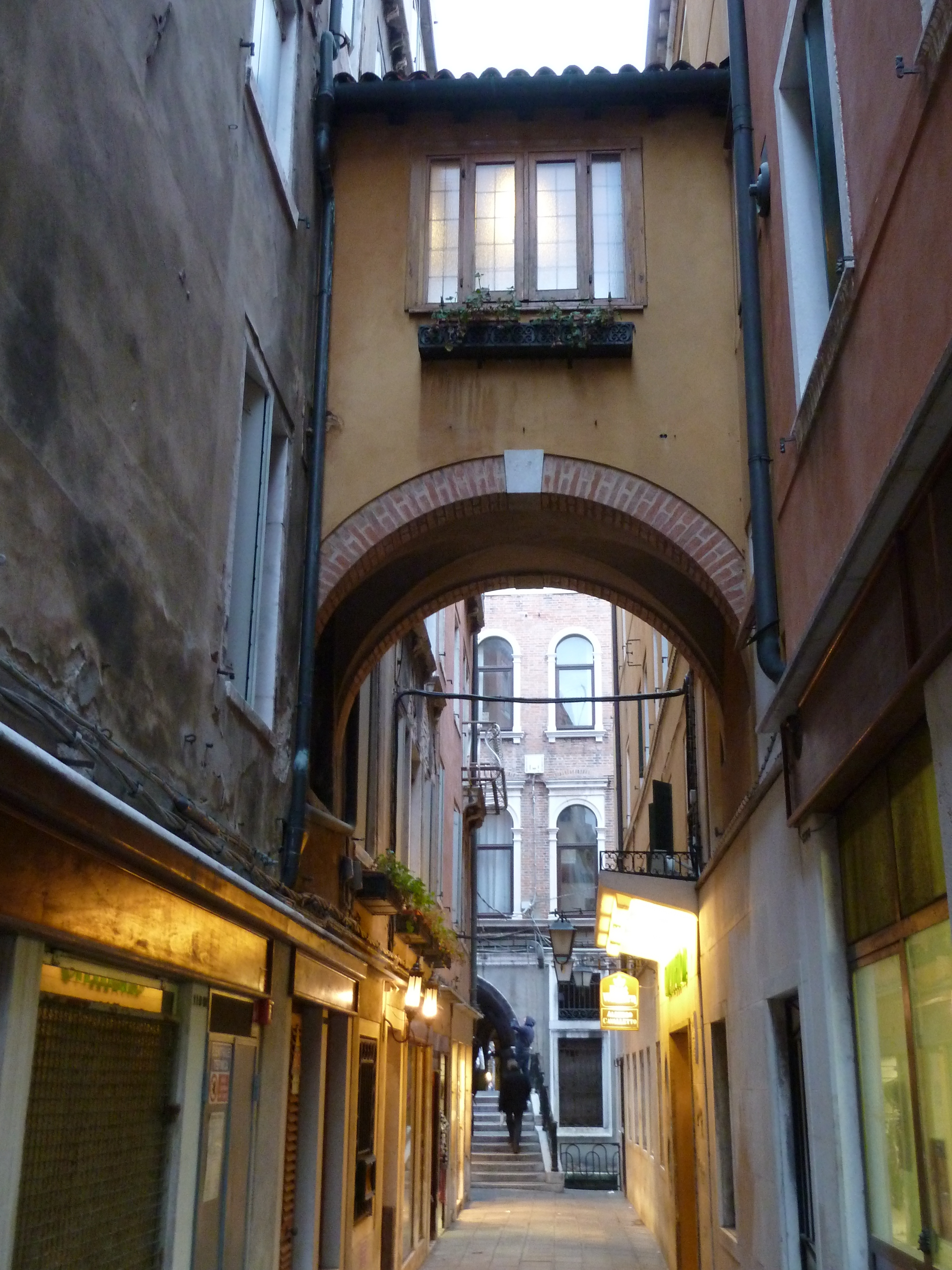
Pont privé de l'hôtel Cavaletti (Bacino Orseolo)

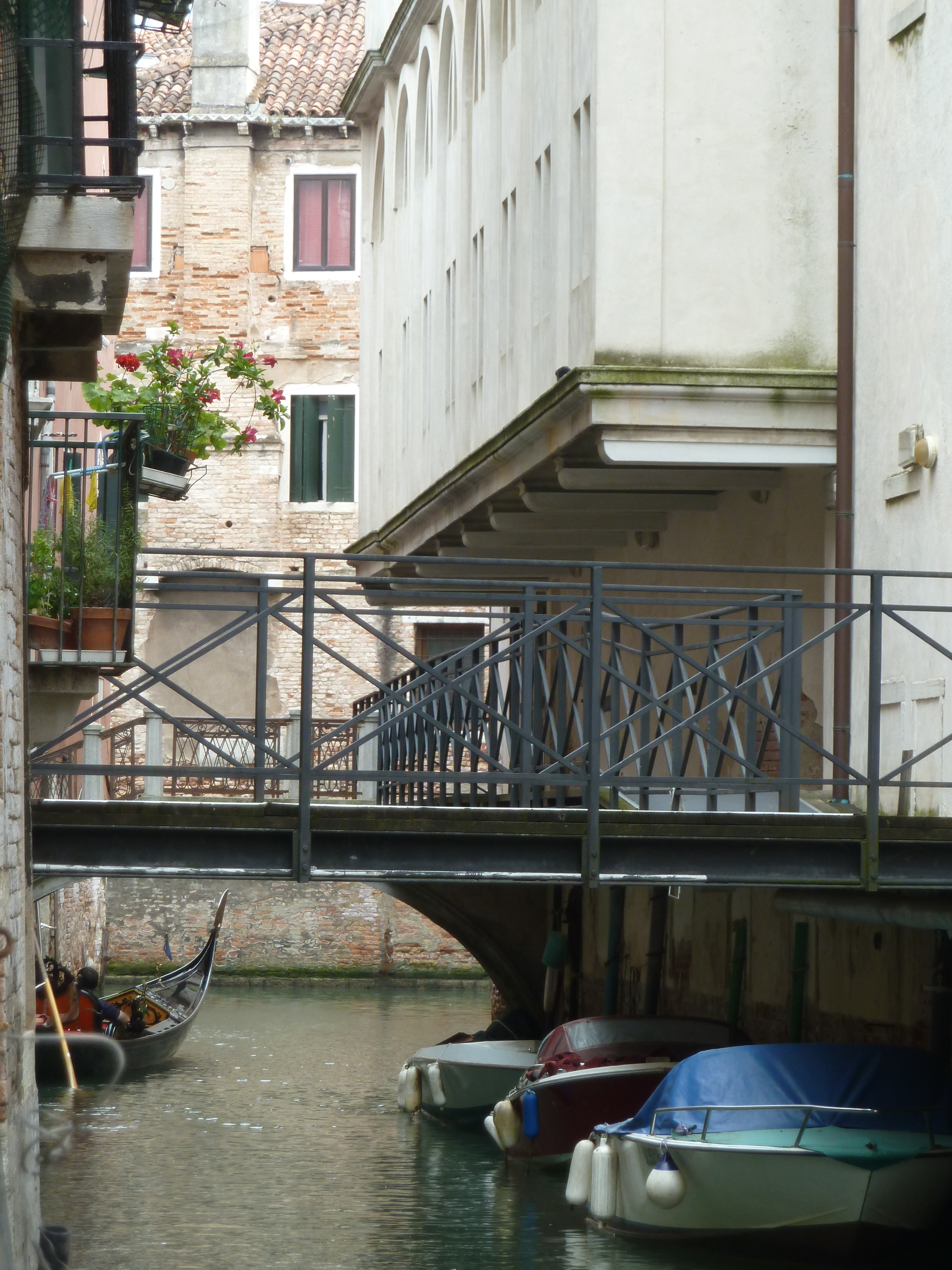
Private bridge of the Teatro Malibran over the rio de San Giovanni Crisostomo

=== Border San Marco - Castello ===
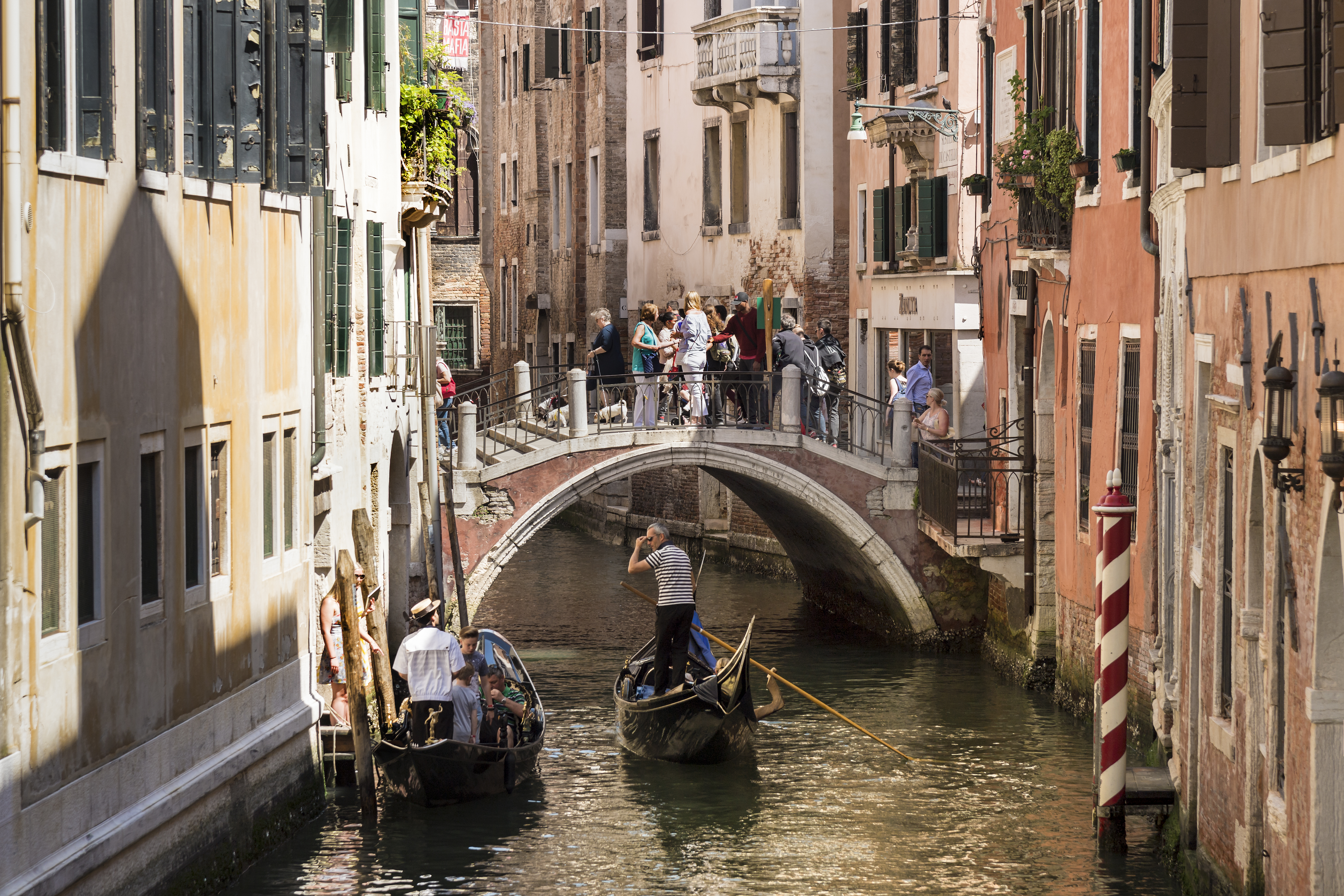
Ponte Sant Antonio
Rio de la Fava

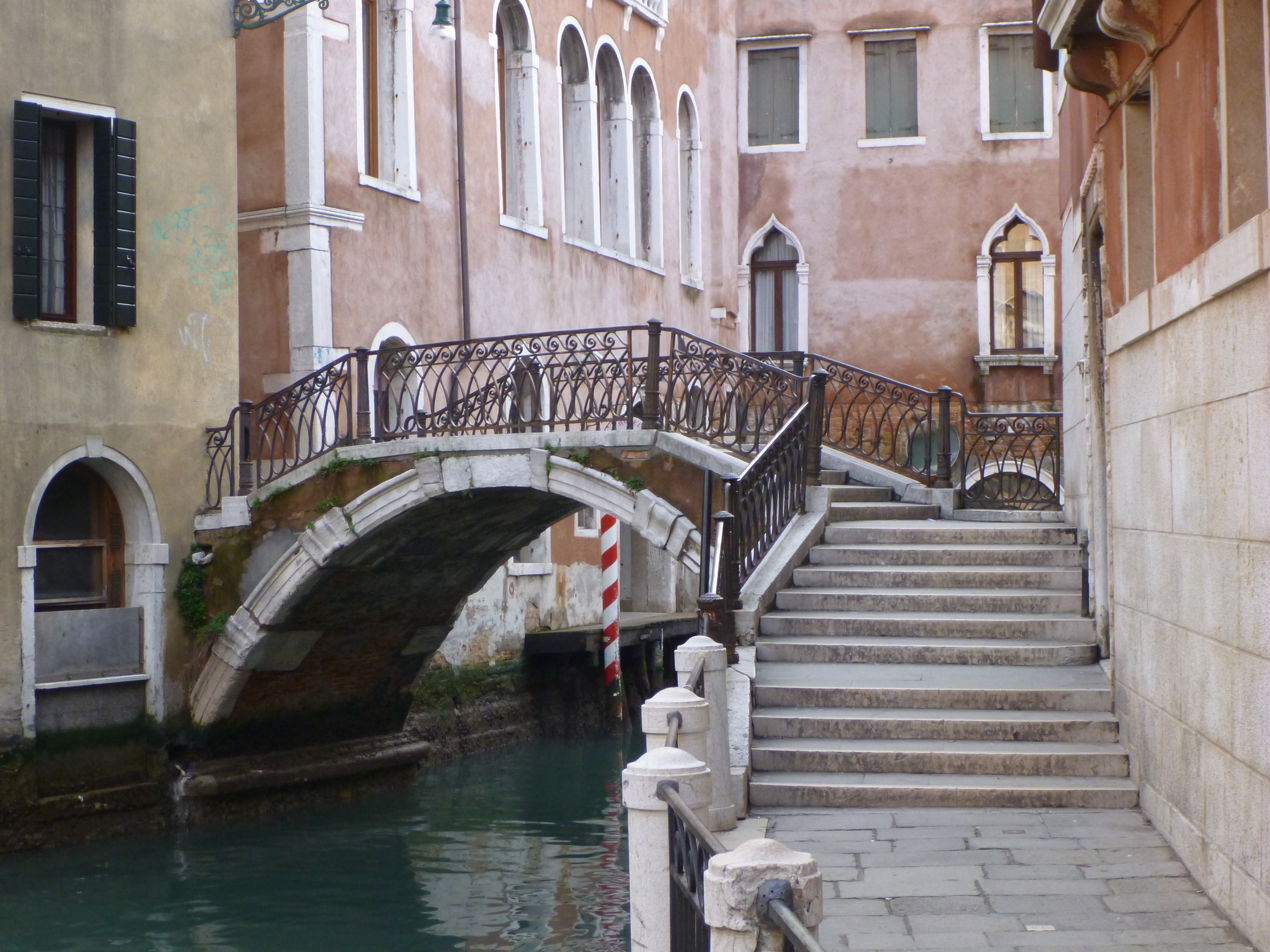
Ponte de l'Anzolo
Rio de San Zulian

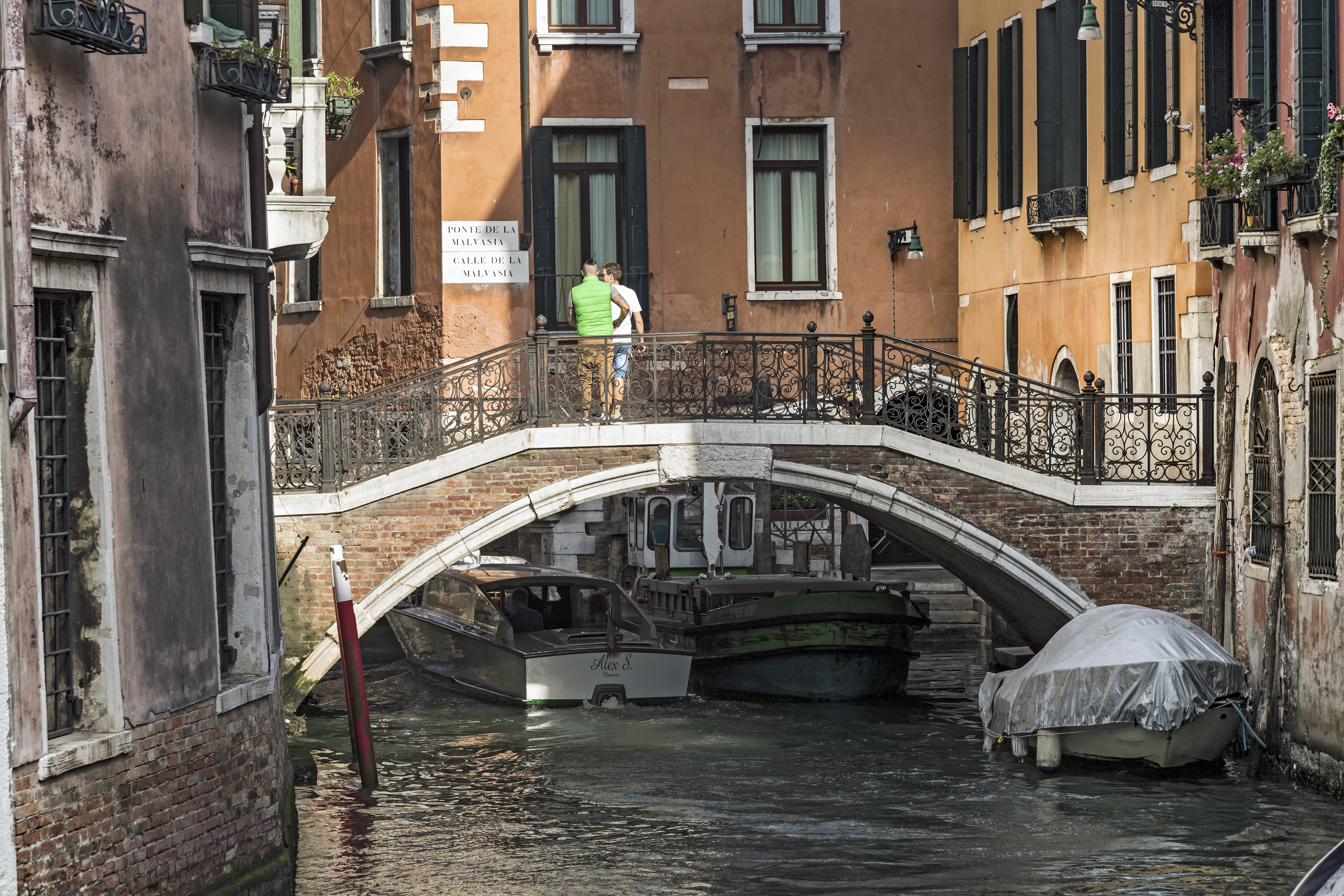
Ponte Balbi
Rio de San Zulian

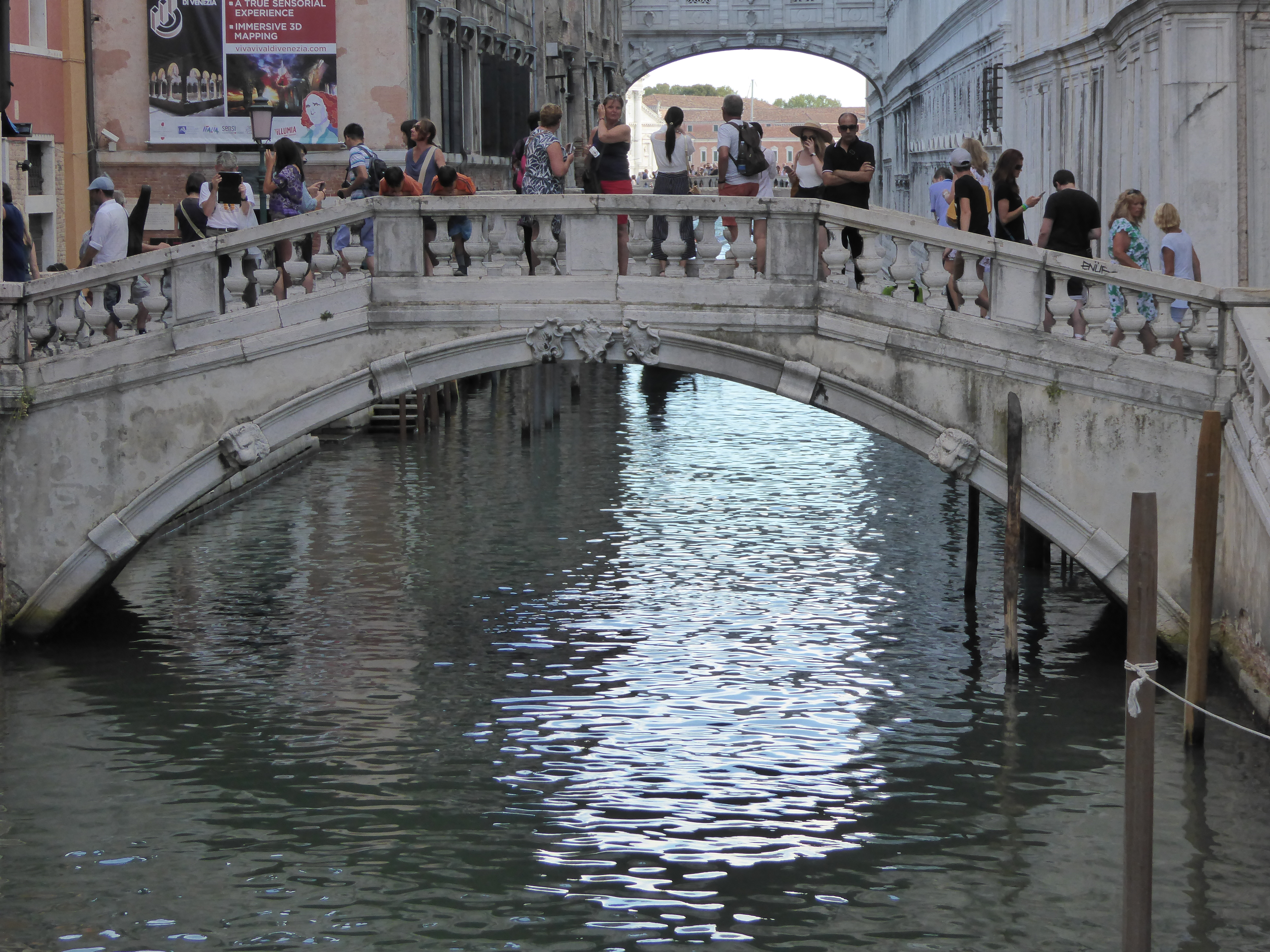
Ponte de la Canonica
Rio de la Canonica

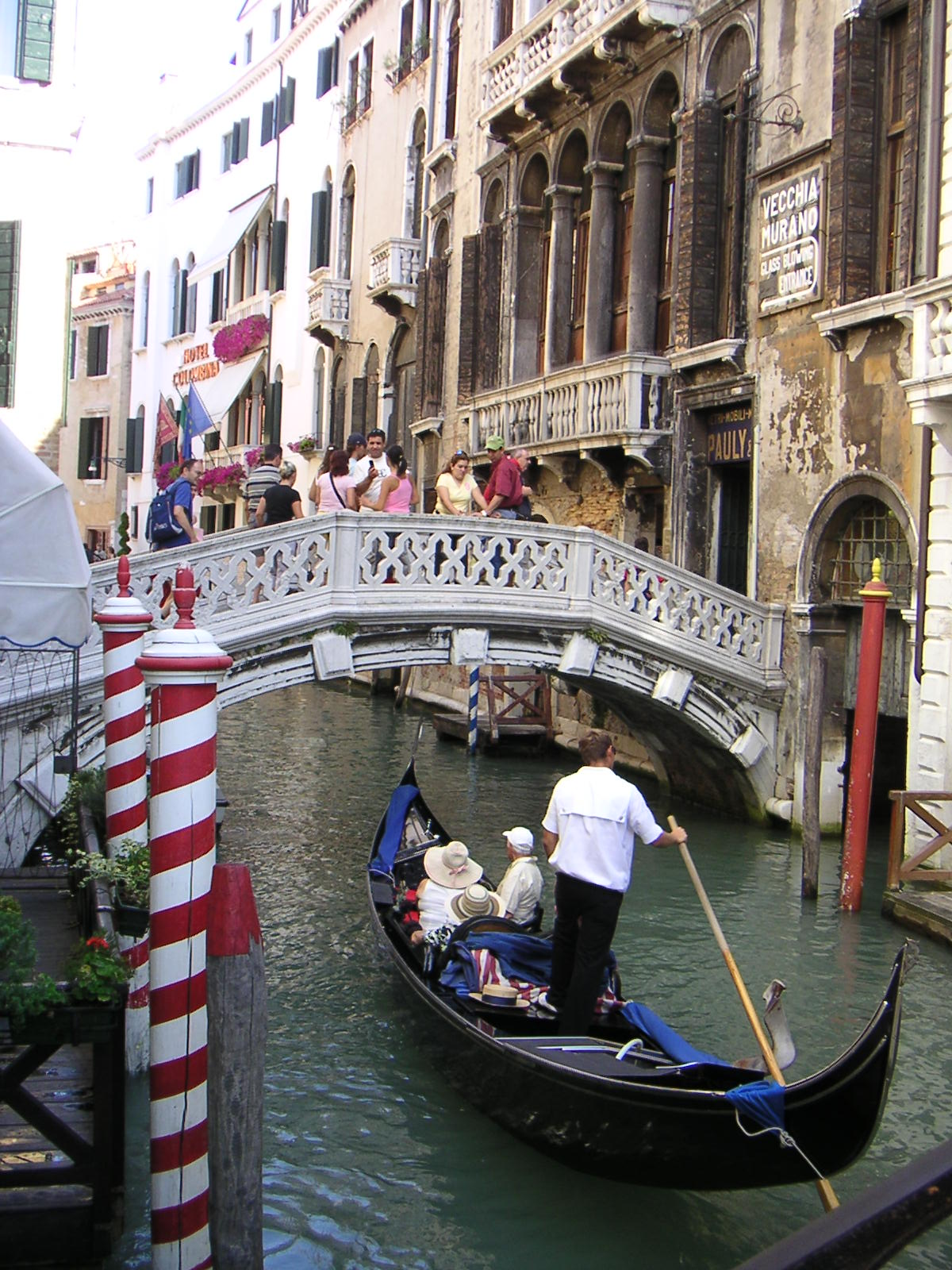
Ponte dei Consorzi
Rio de la Canonica

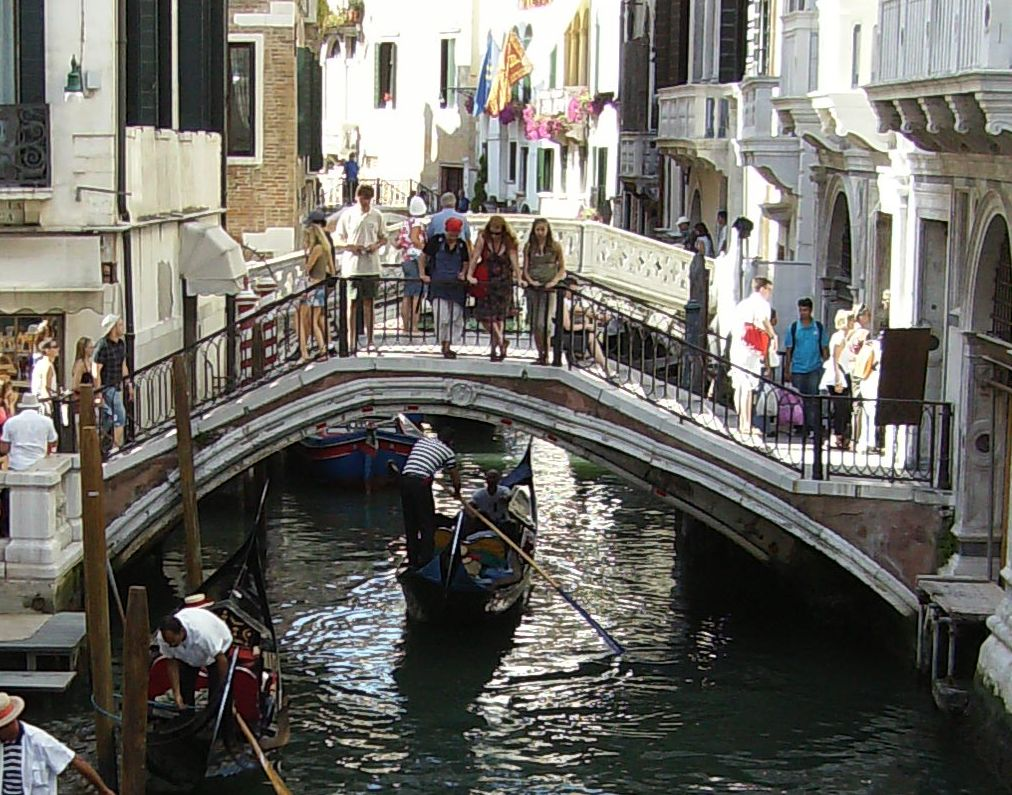
Pont privé Cappello
Rio de la Canonica

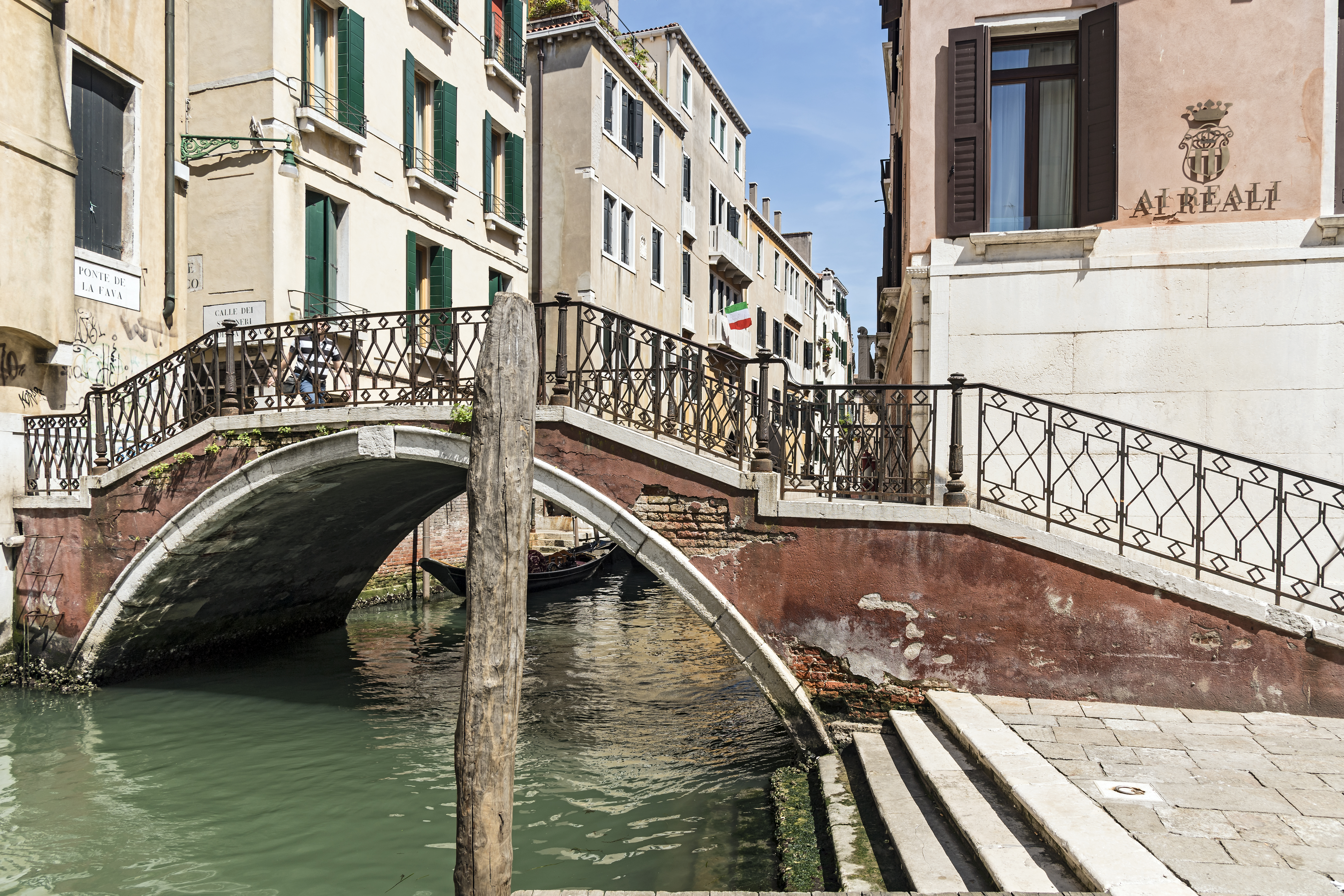
Ponte de la Fava
Rio de la Fava

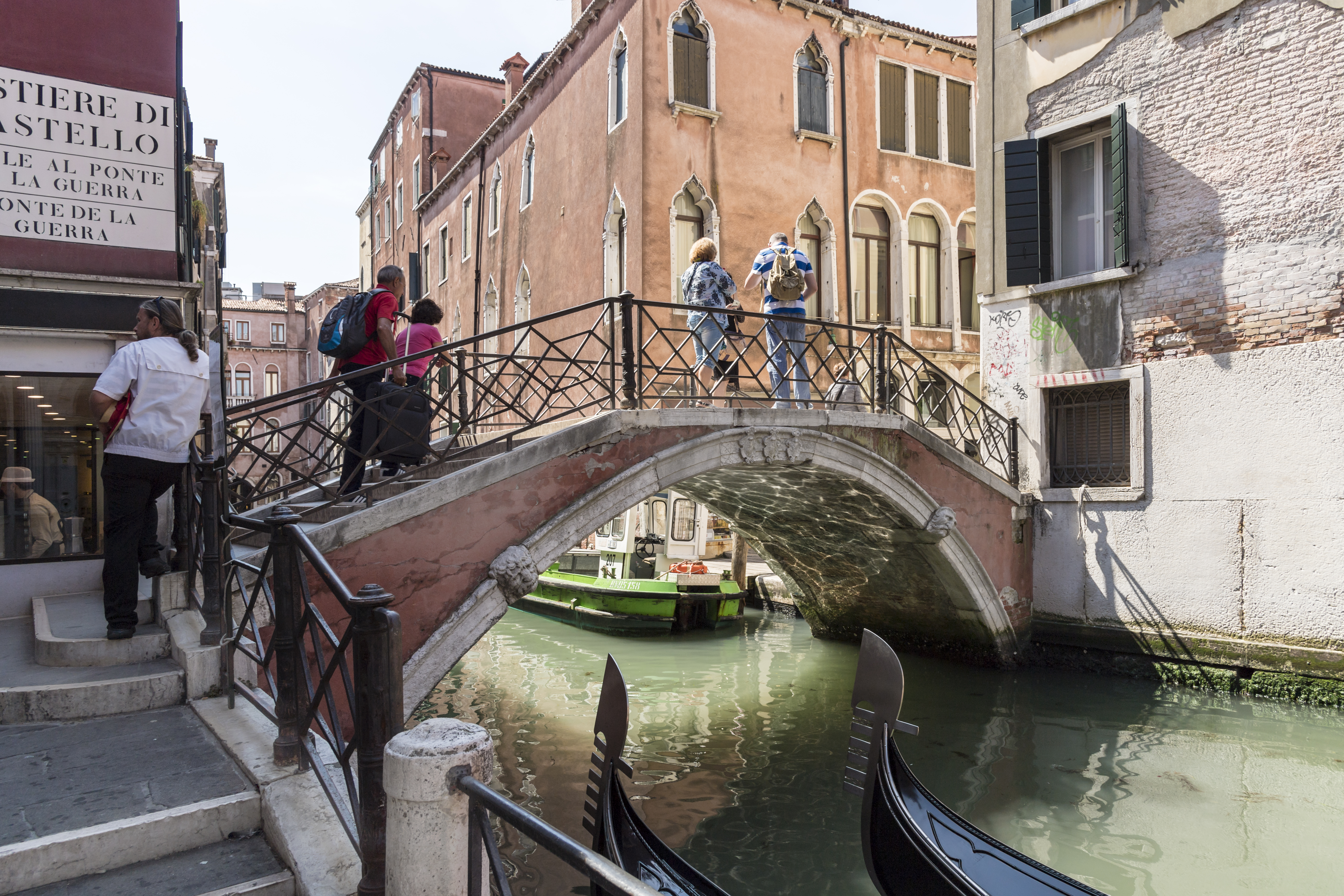
Ponte de la Guerra
Rio de San Zulian

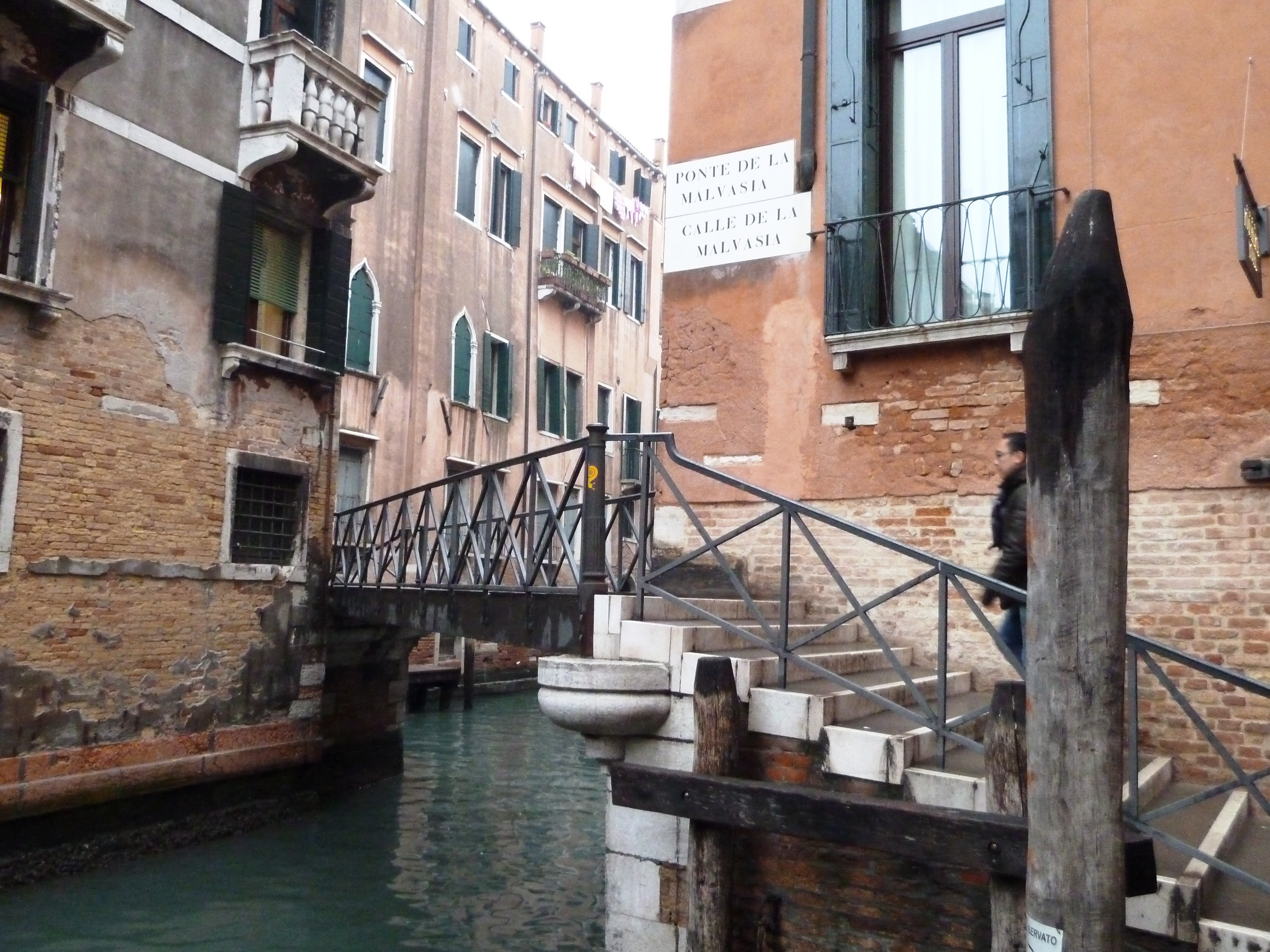
Ponte de la Malvasia
Rio de San Zulian

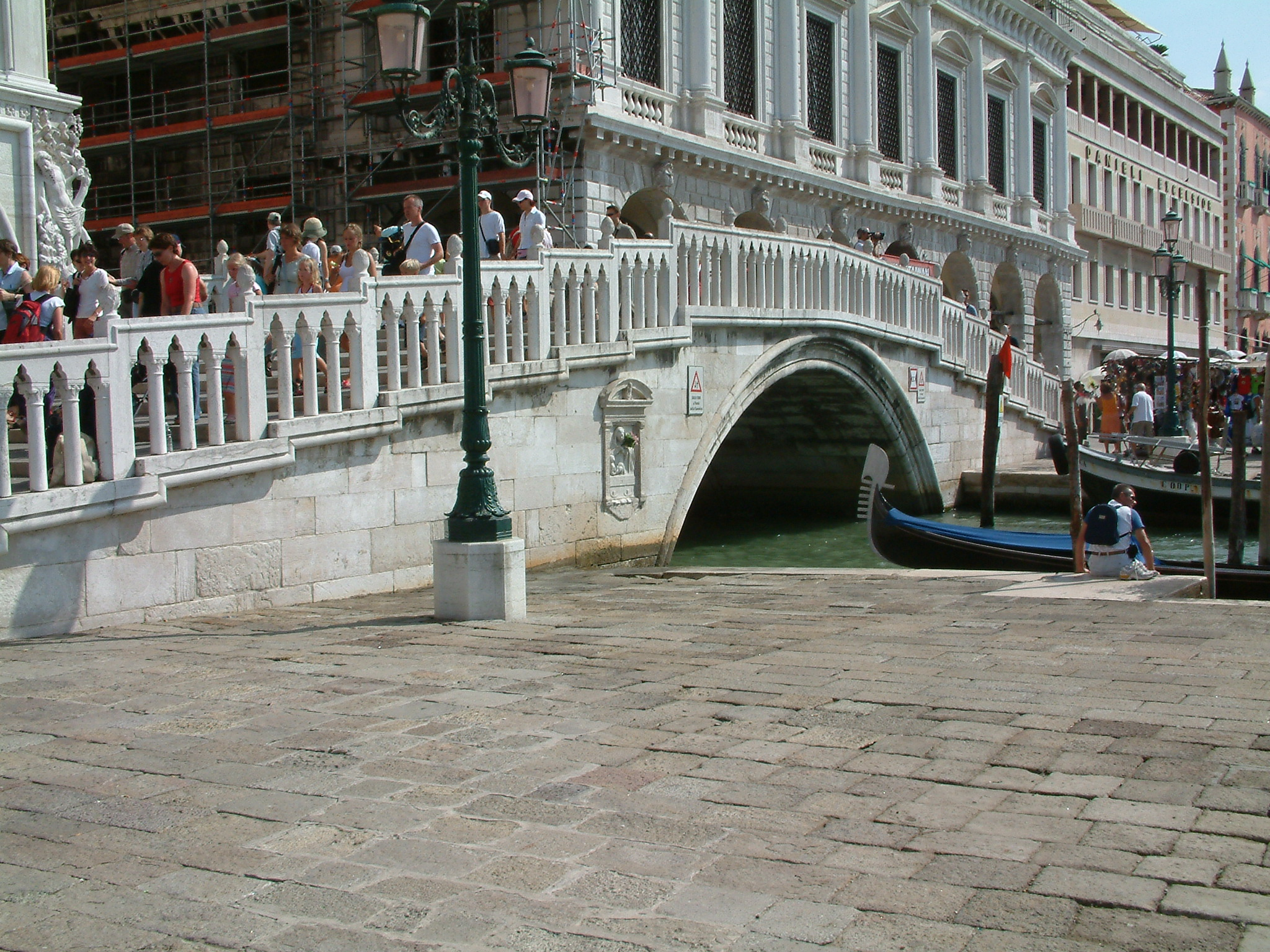
Ponte della Paglia
Rio de la Canonica

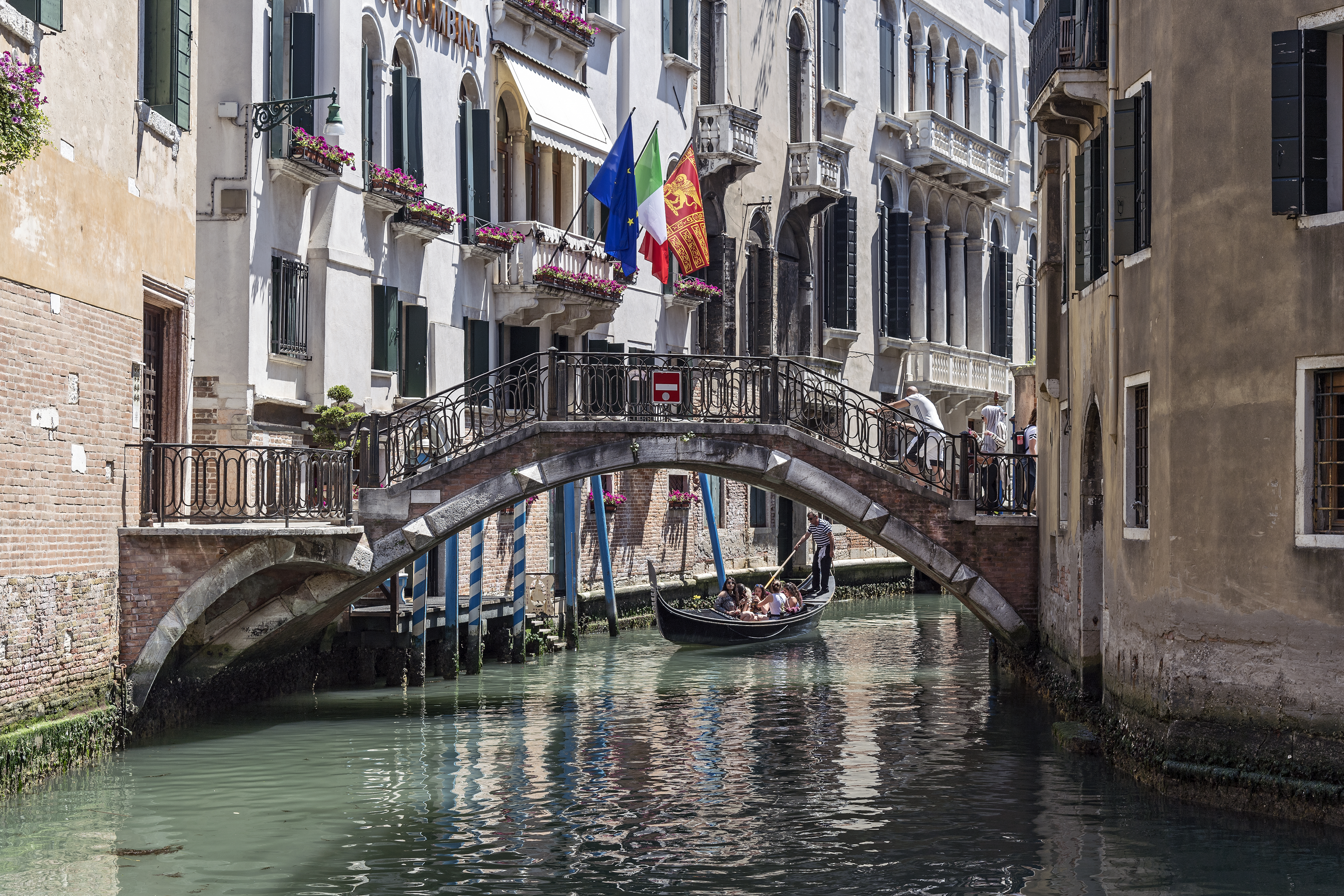
Ponte del Remedio
Rio de la Canonica

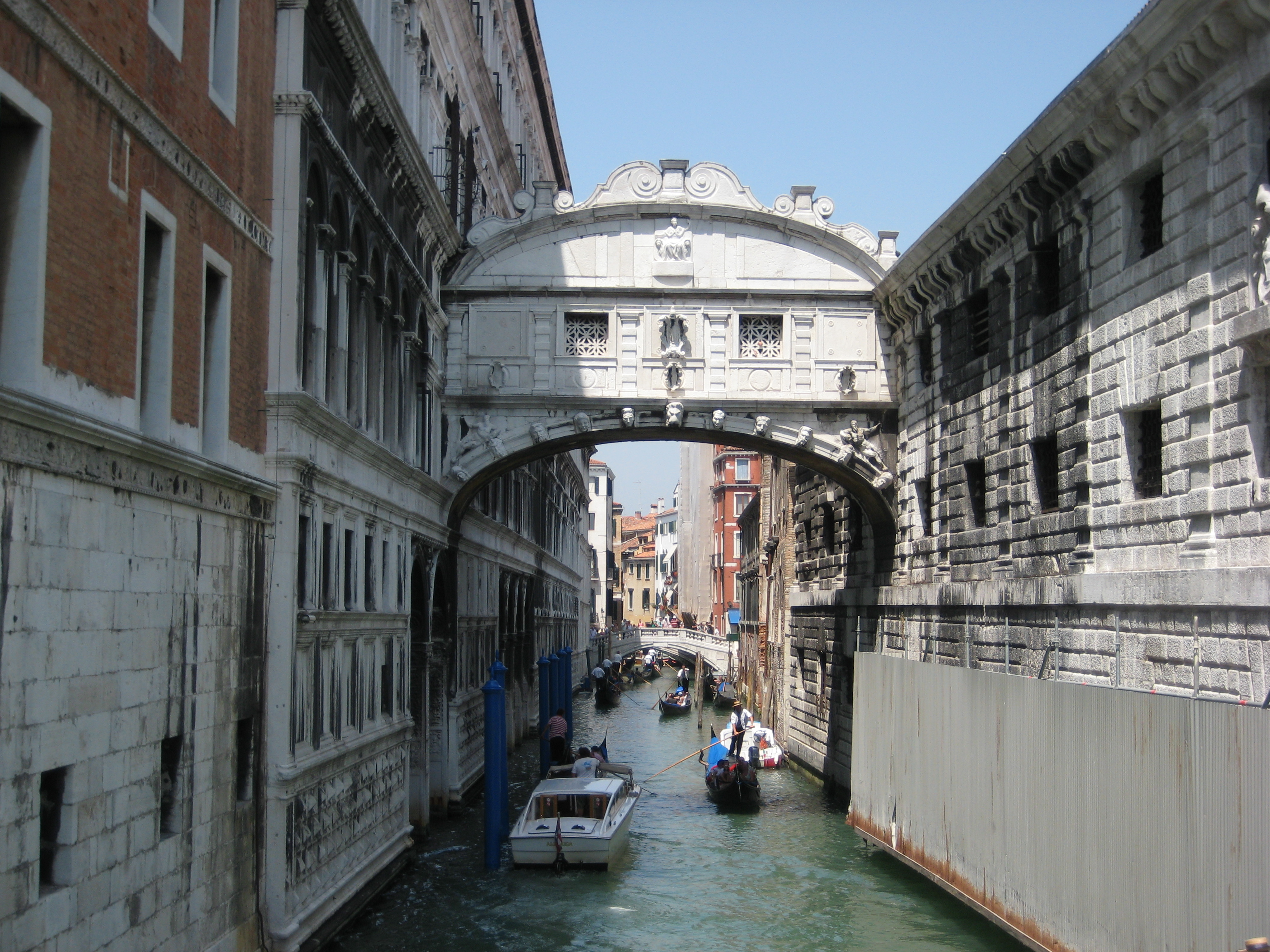
Ponte de i Sospiri
Rio de la Canonica

== Sestieri of Castello ==
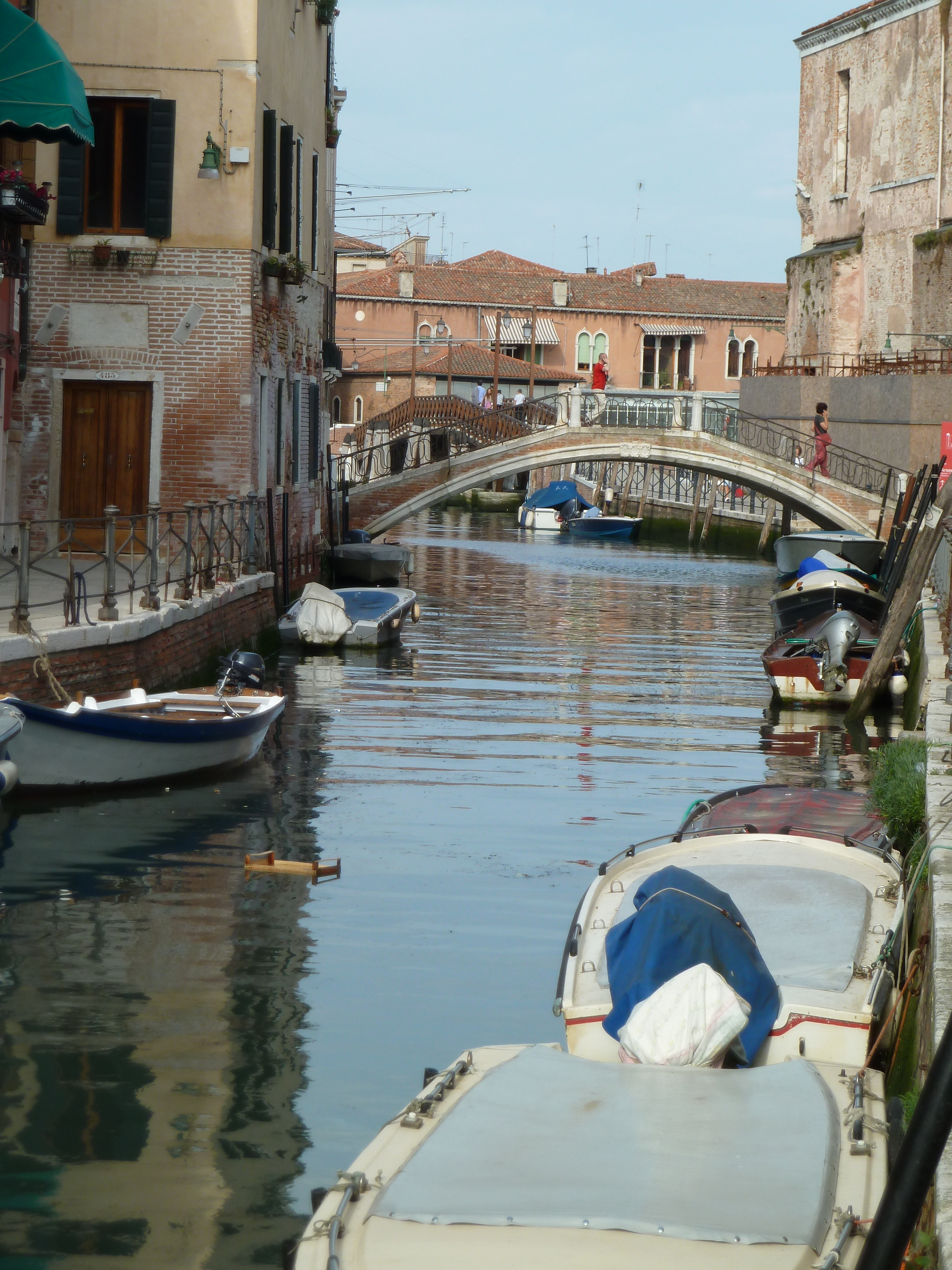
Ponte Sant'Anna
Rio de Sant'Ana

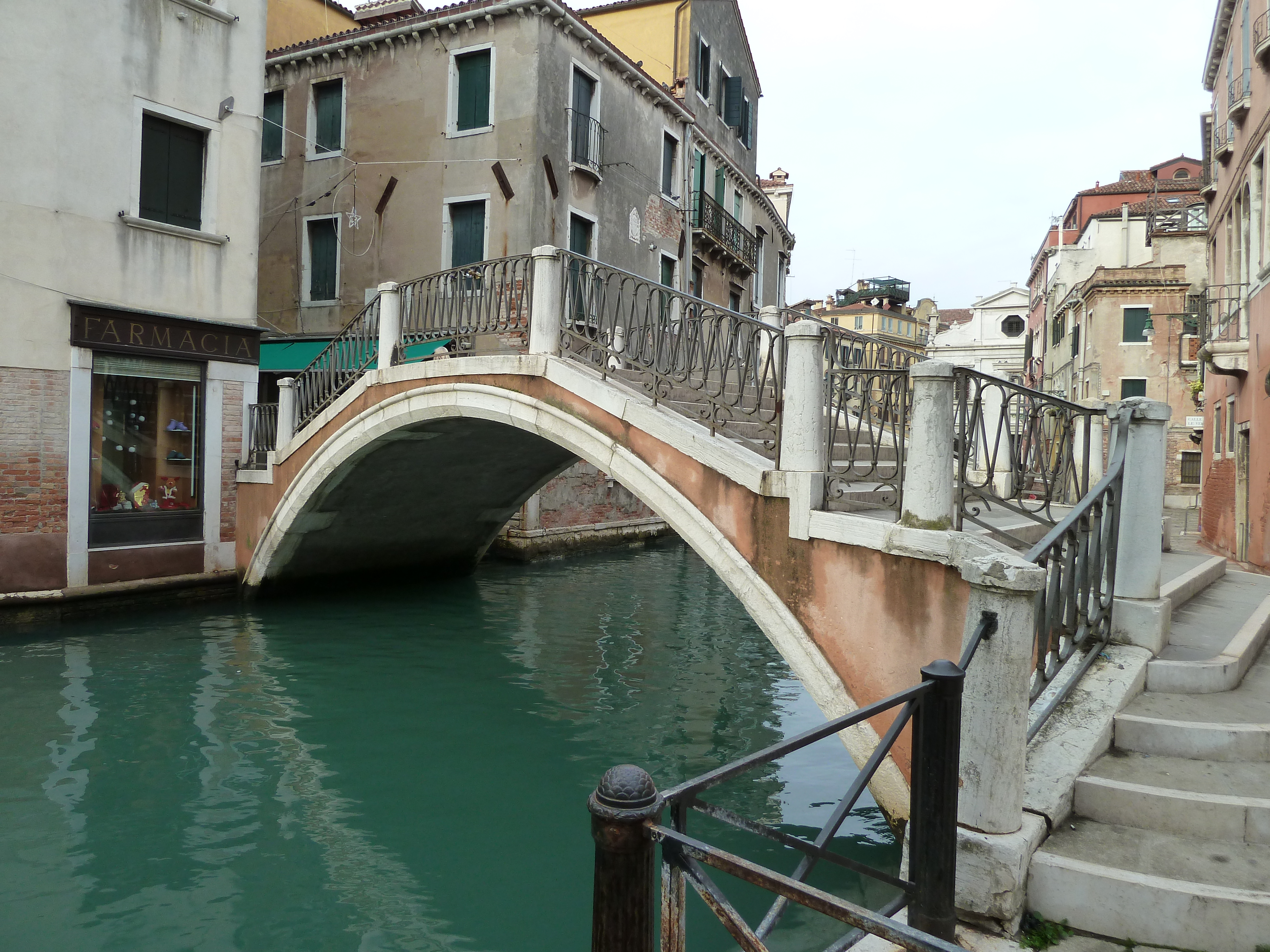
Ponte Sant'Antonin
Rio de Sant'Antonin

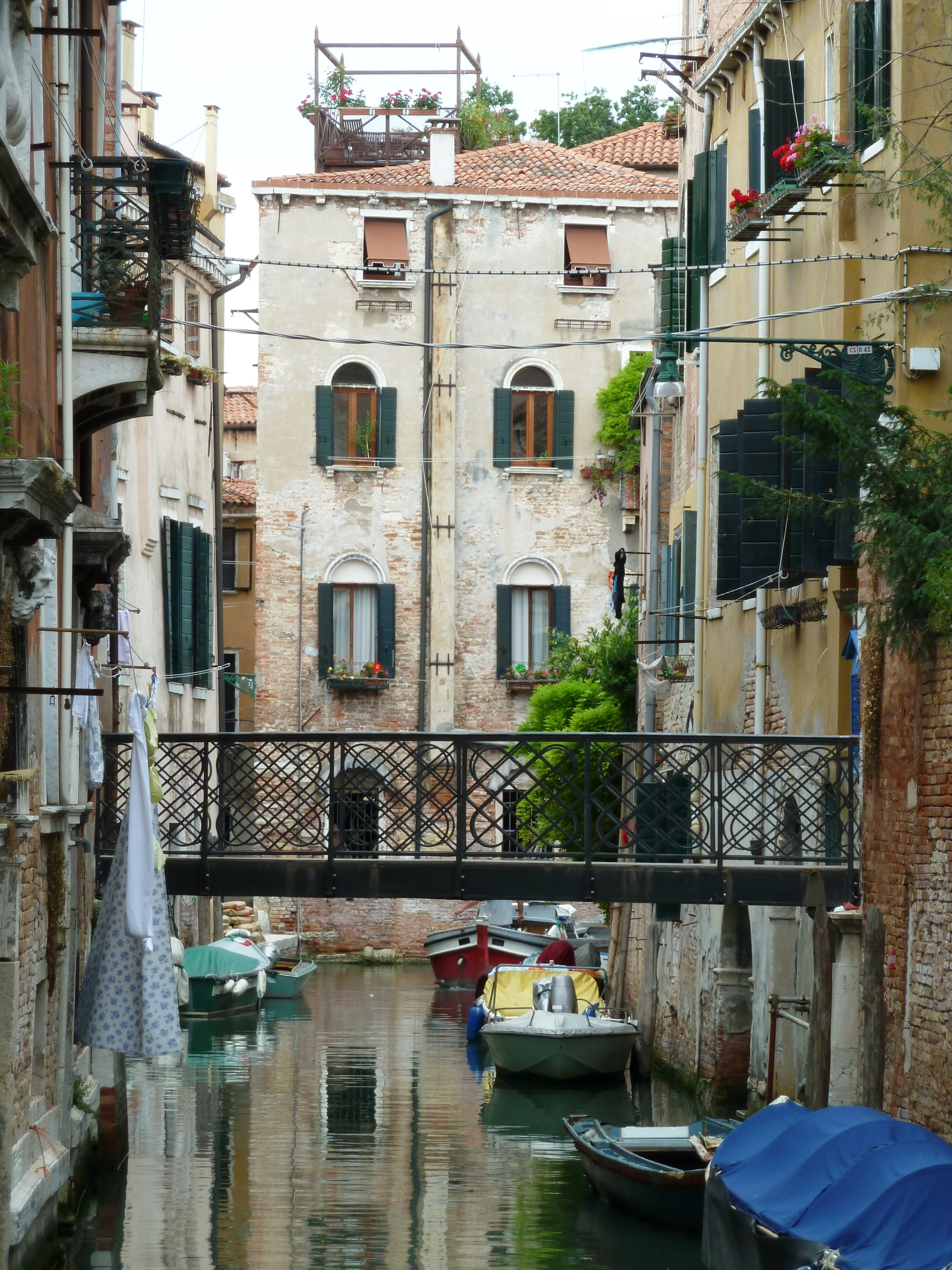
Ponte dell Arco
Rio de San Martin

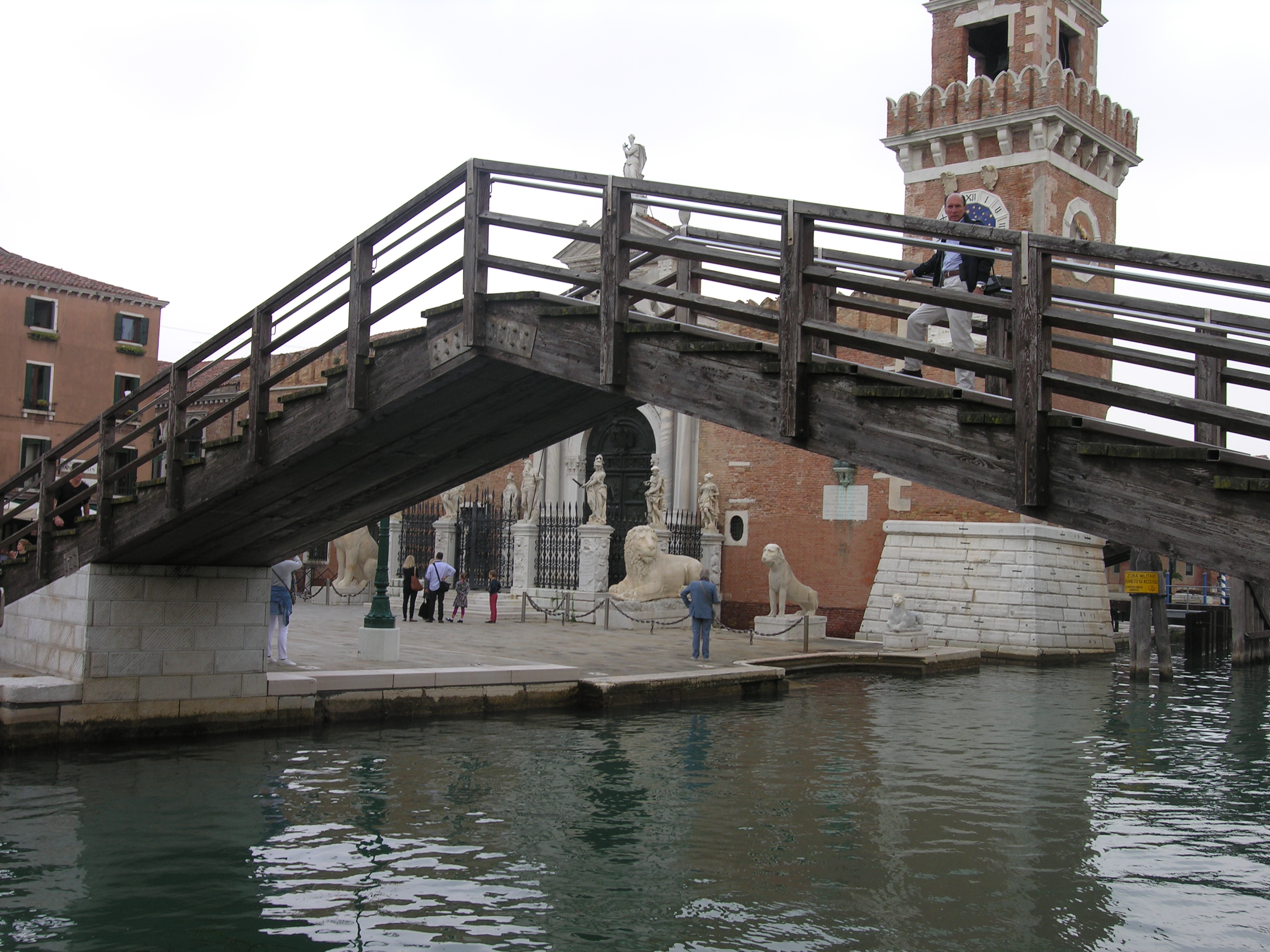
Ponte de l'Arsenal Rio de l'Arsenal

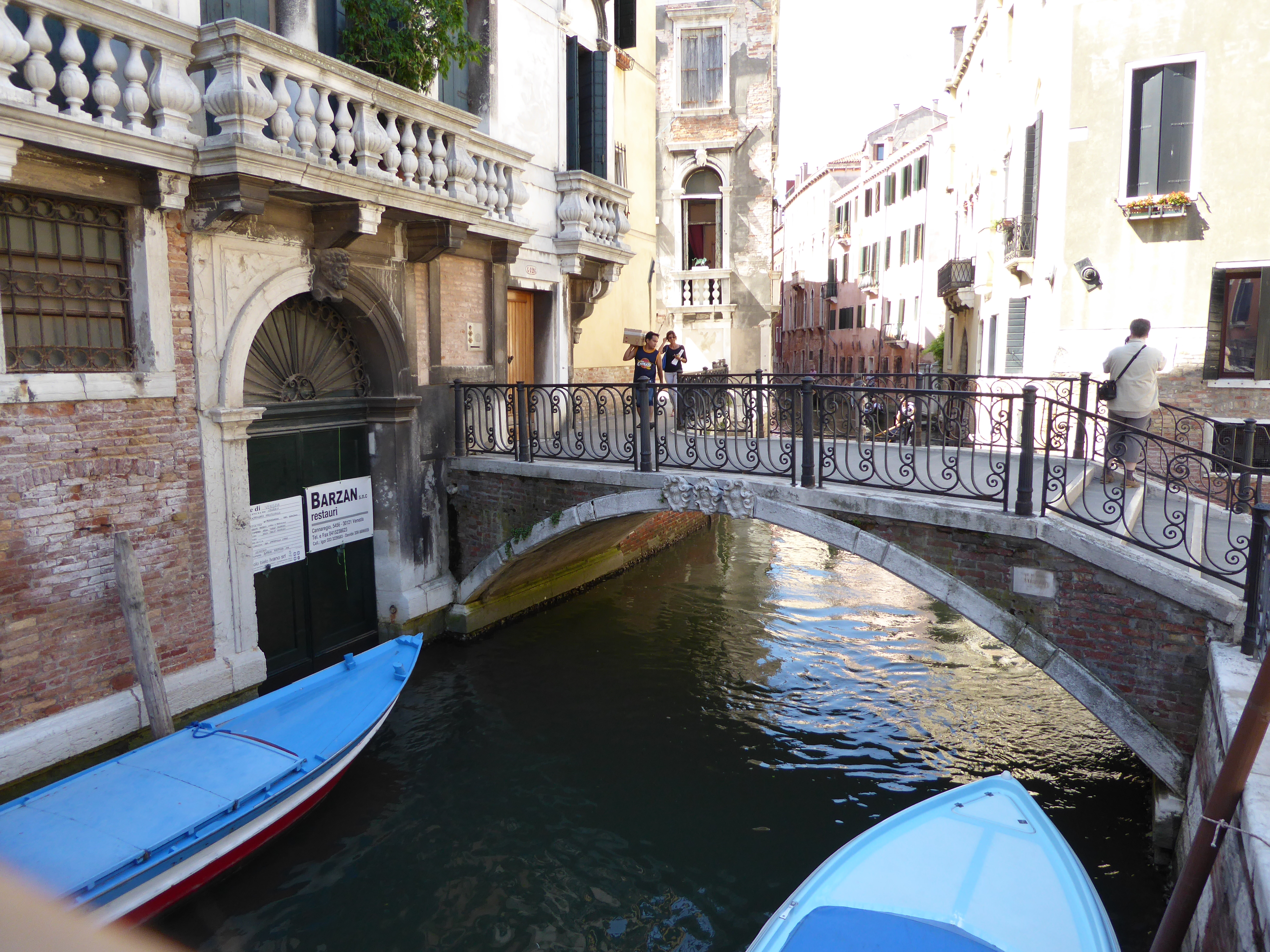
Ponte Avogadro
Rio de Santa Maria Formosa

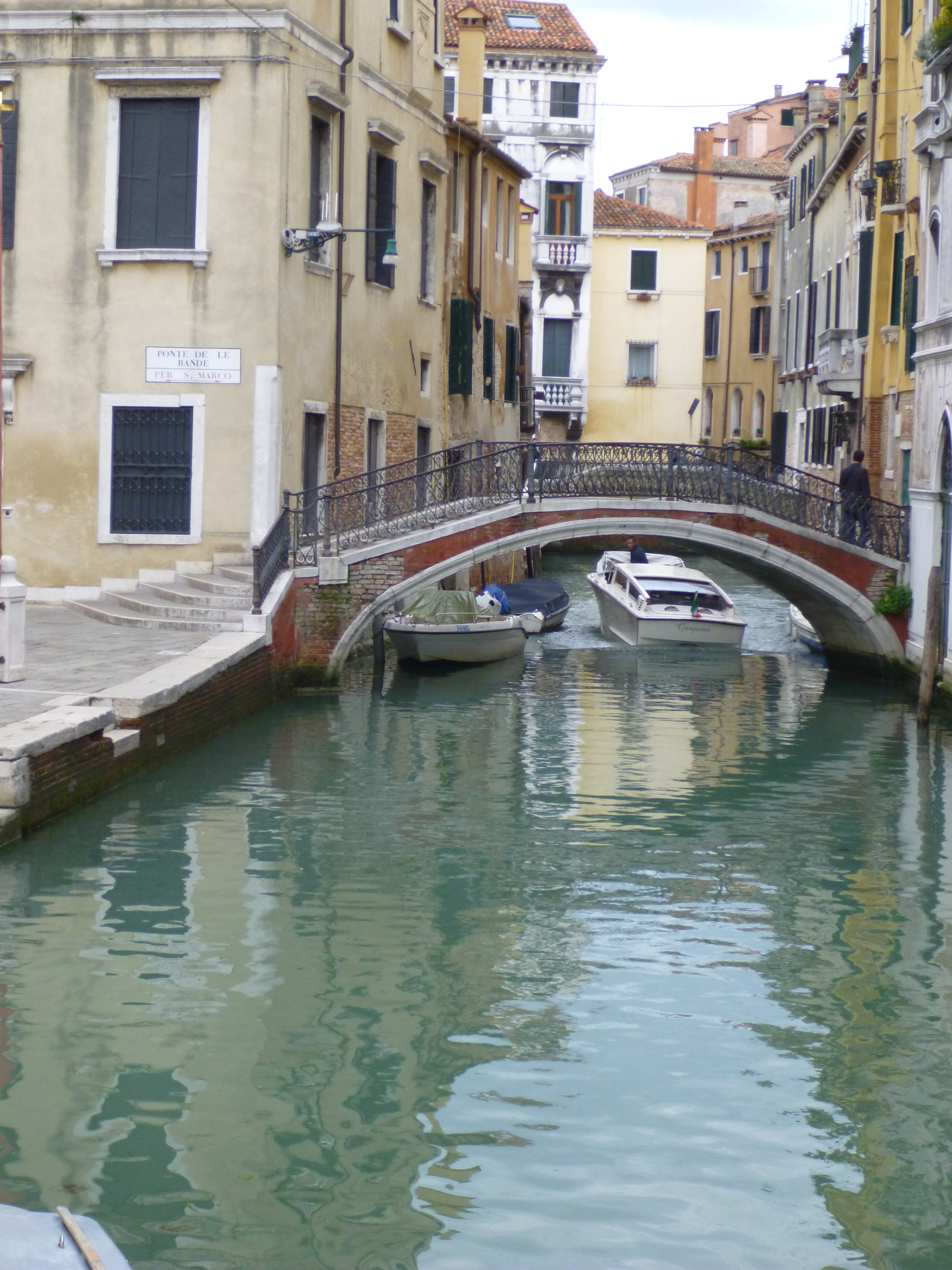
Ponte de le Bande
Rio del Mondo Novo

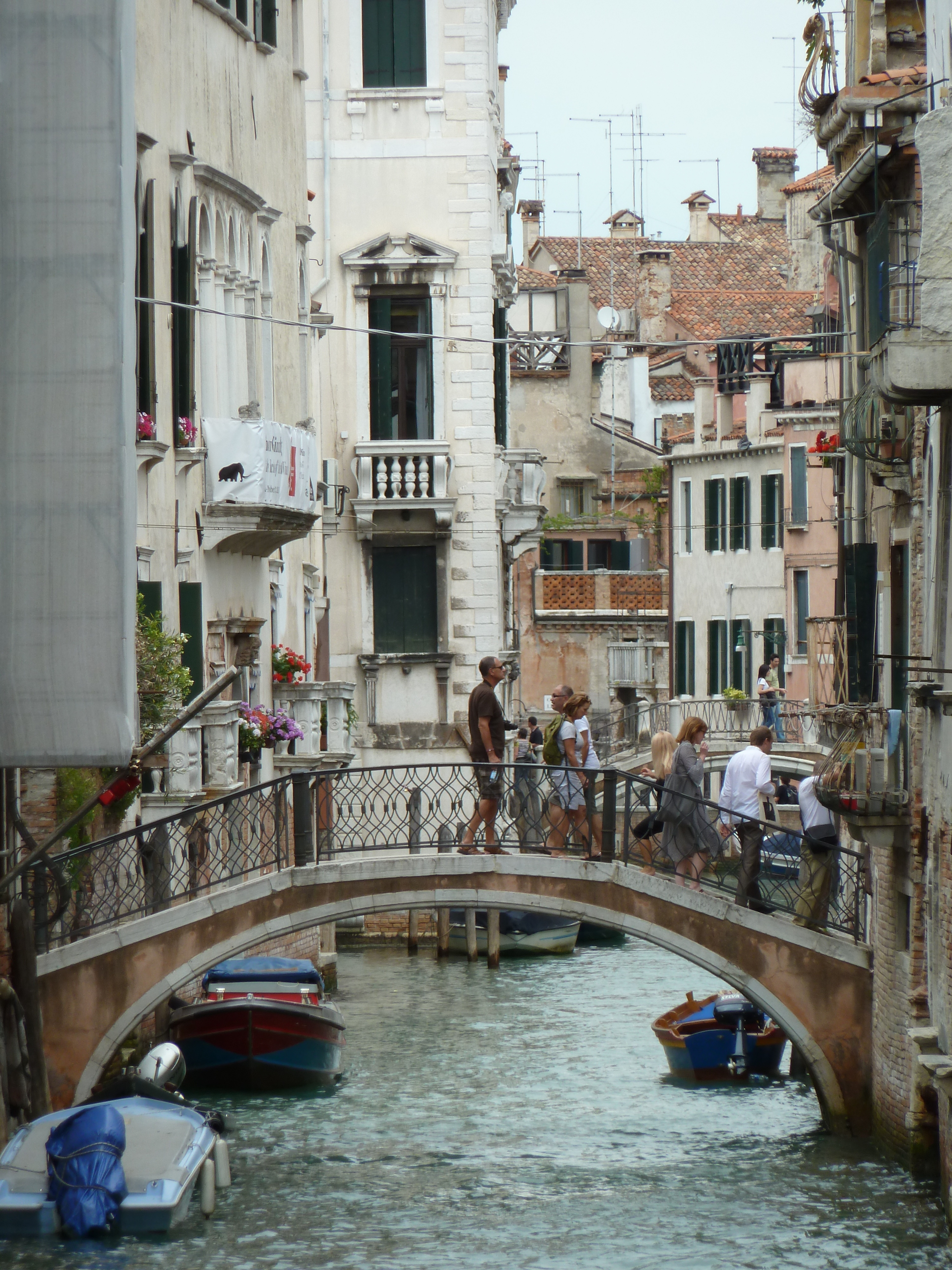
Ponte dei Becchi
Rio de la Pietà

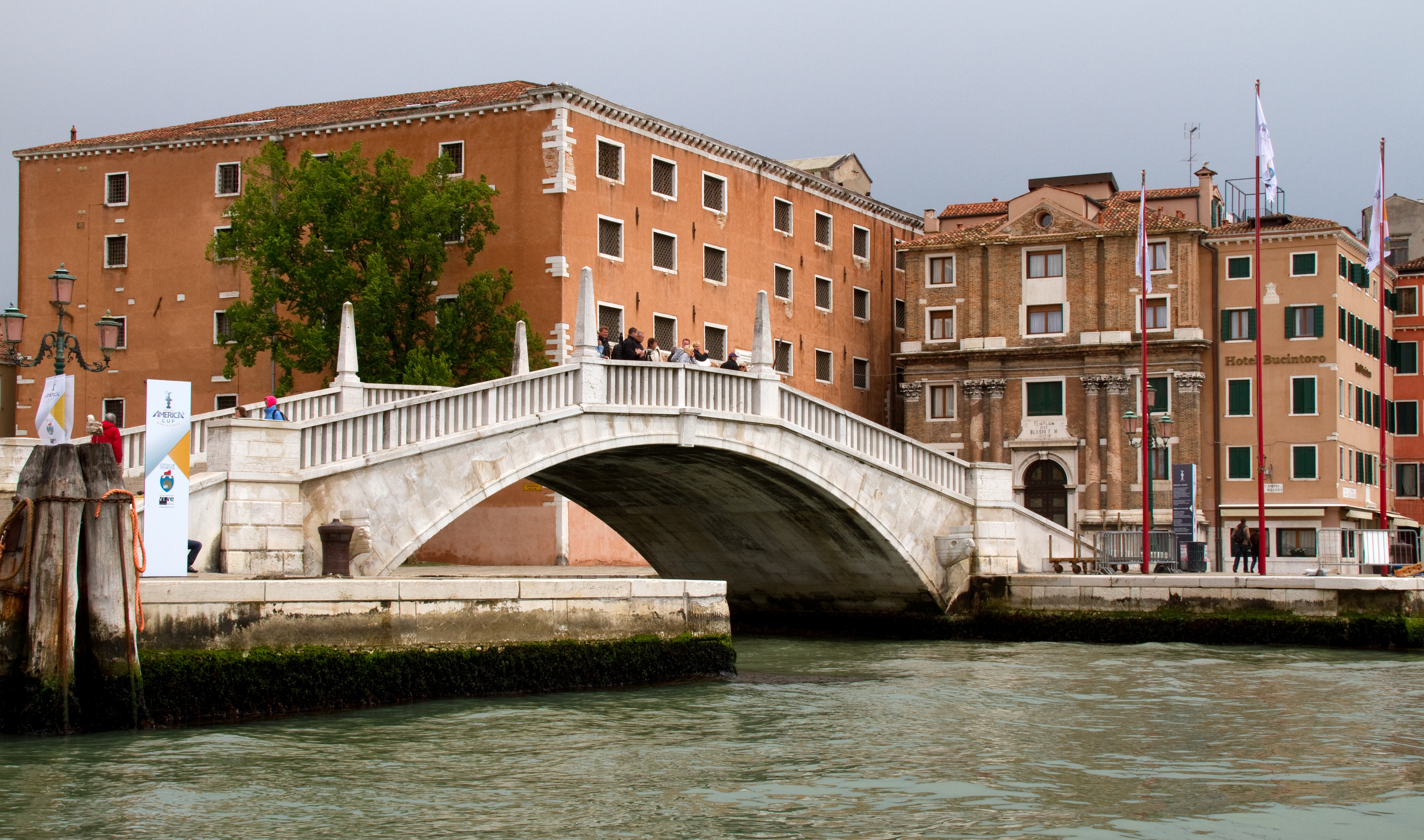
Ponte San Biasio delle Catene
Rio de l'Arsenale

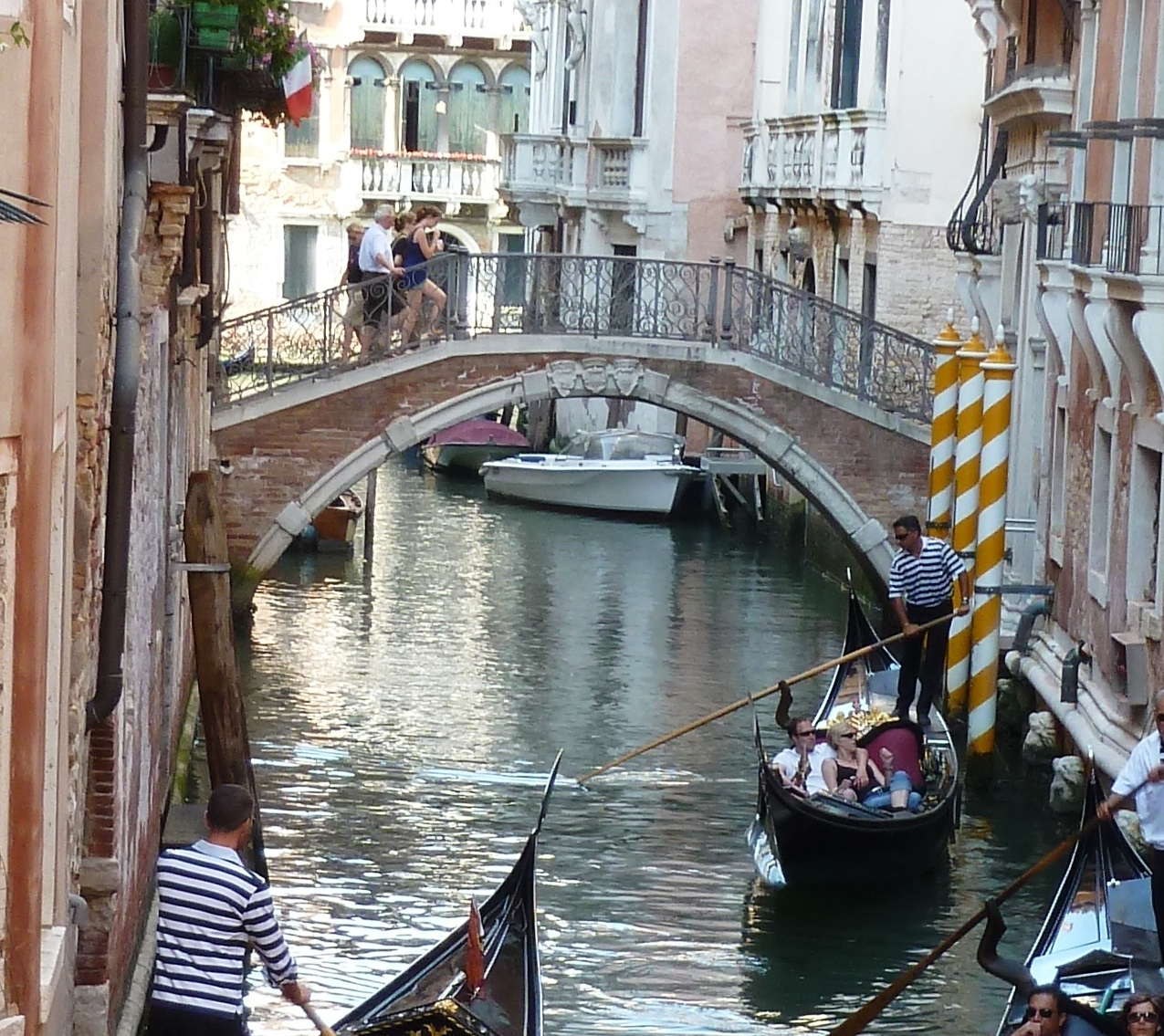
Ponte di Borgoloco
Rio del Pestrin

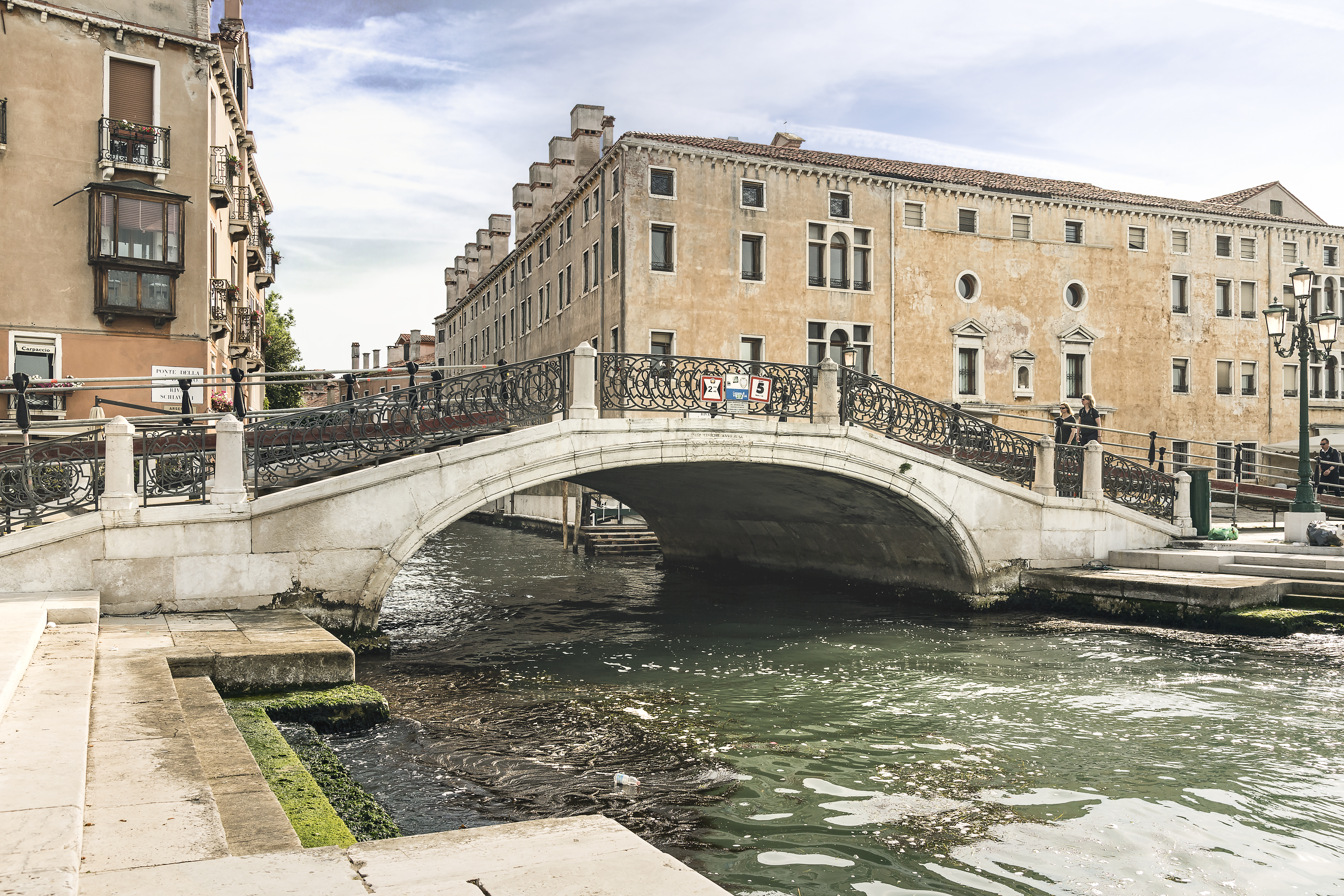
Ponte de la Ca' di Dio
Rio de la Ca' di Dio

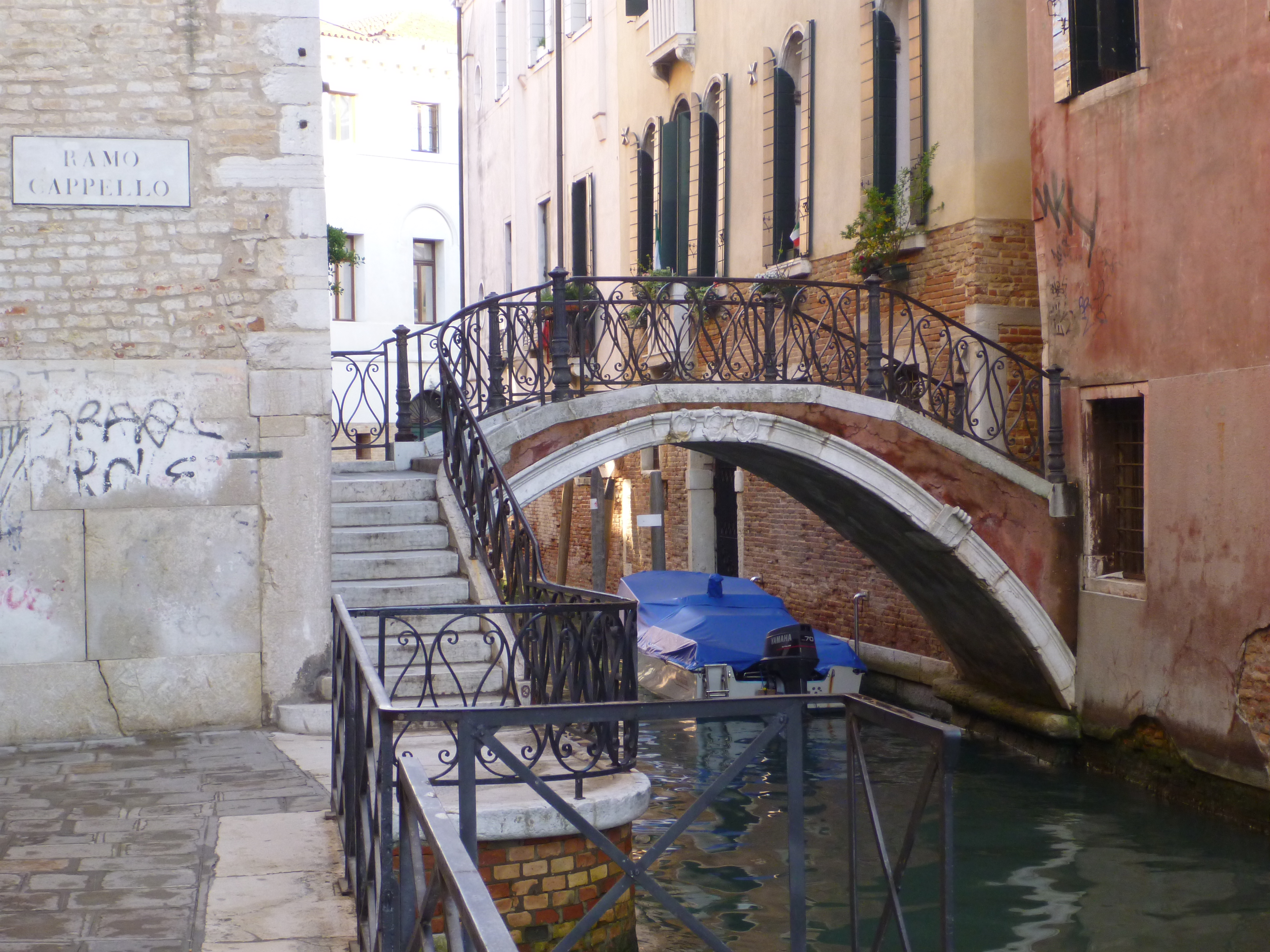
Ponte Cappello
Rio Tetta

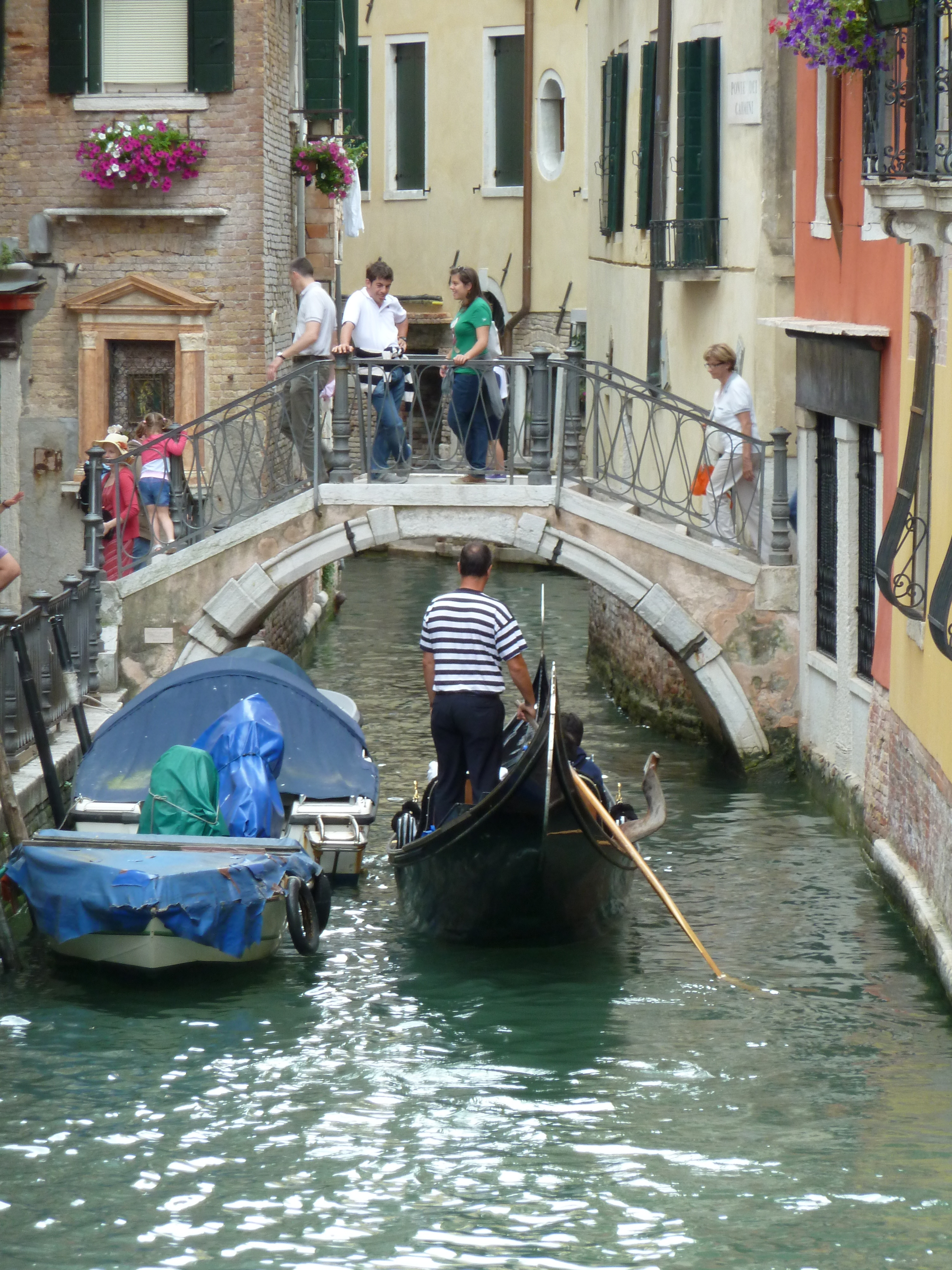
Ponte dei Carmini
Rio de San Provolo

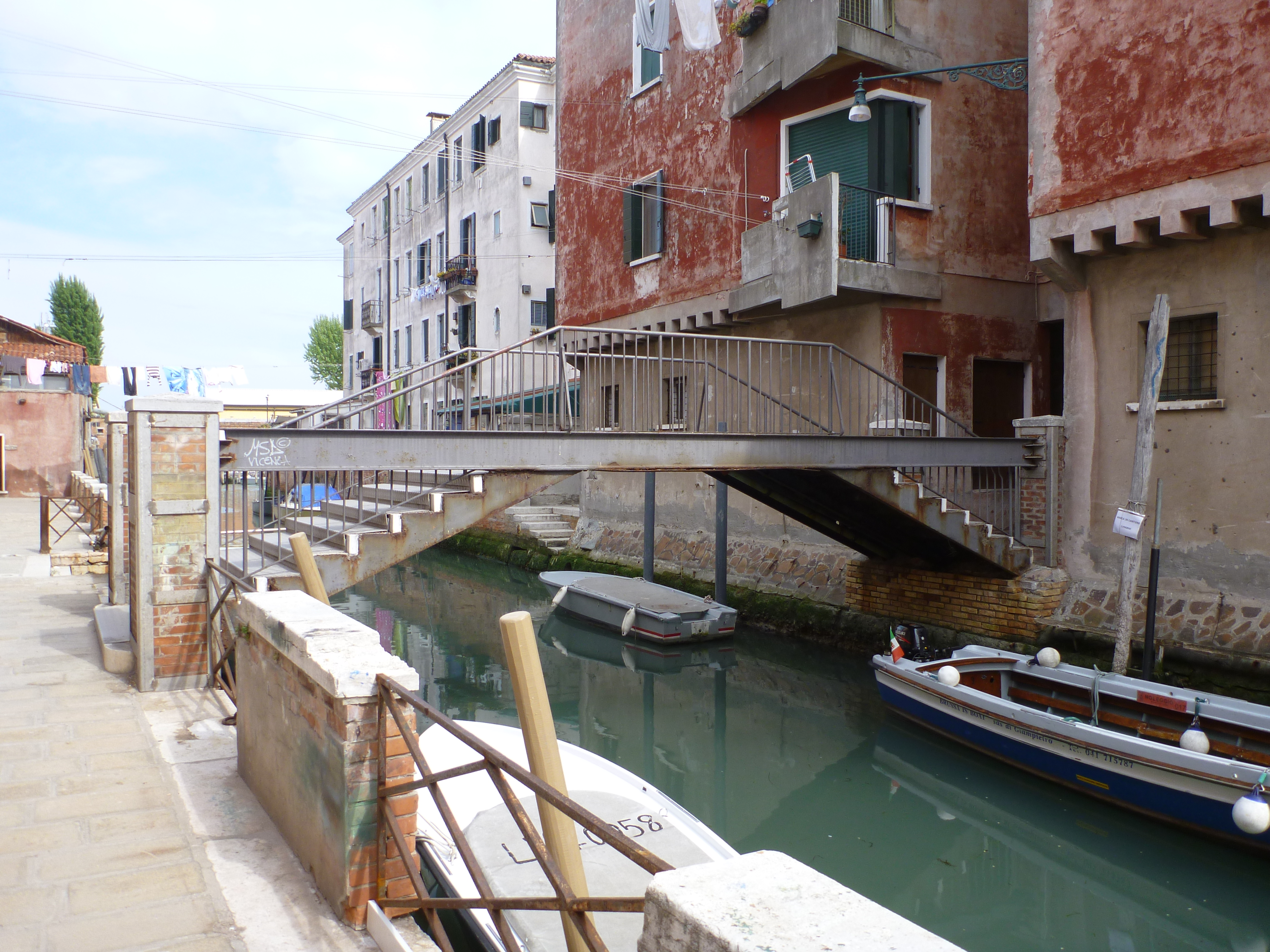
Ponte de le Case Nove
Rio de Sant'Isepo

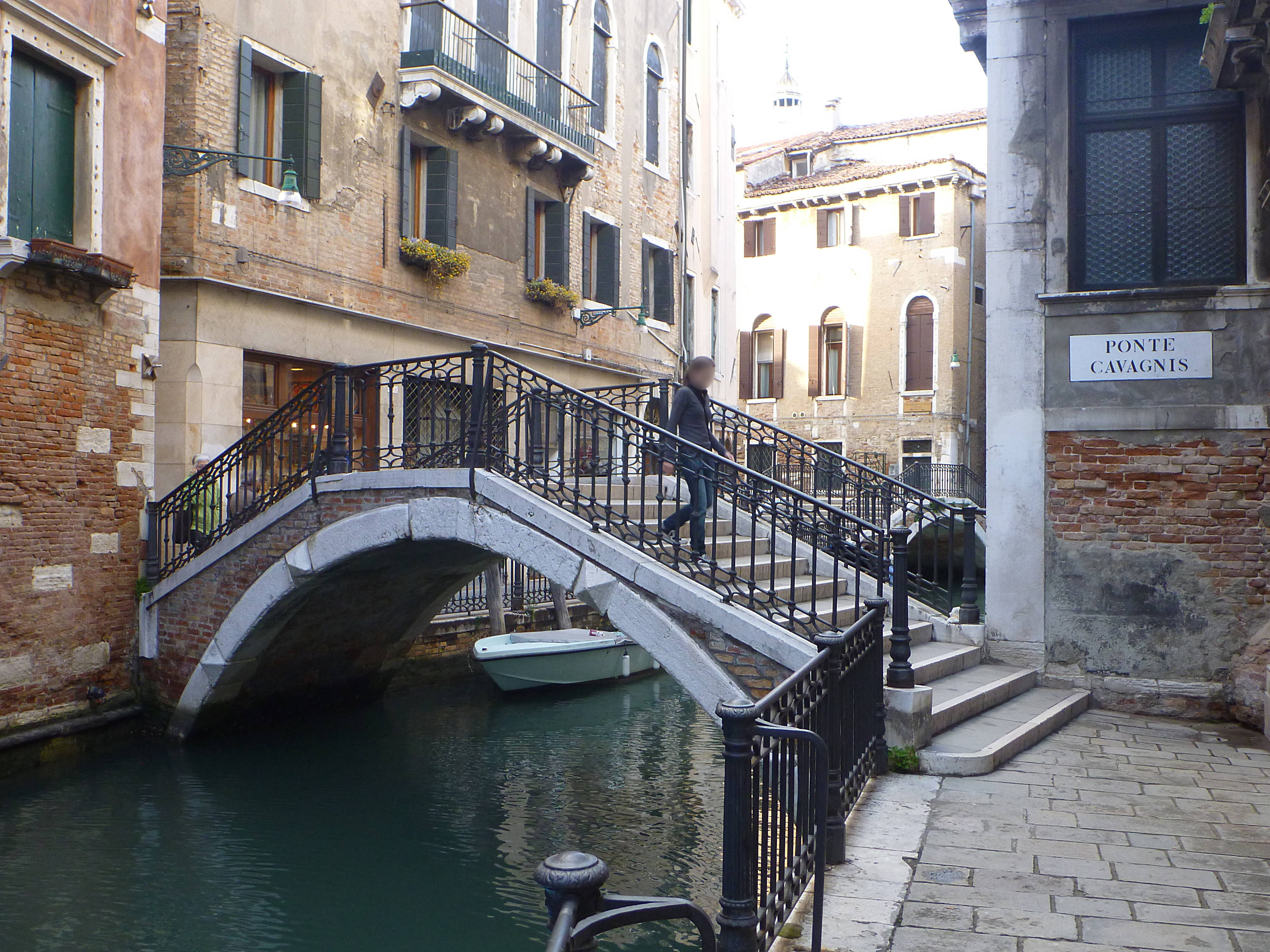
Ponte Cavagnis / -Cavanis
Rio de San Severo

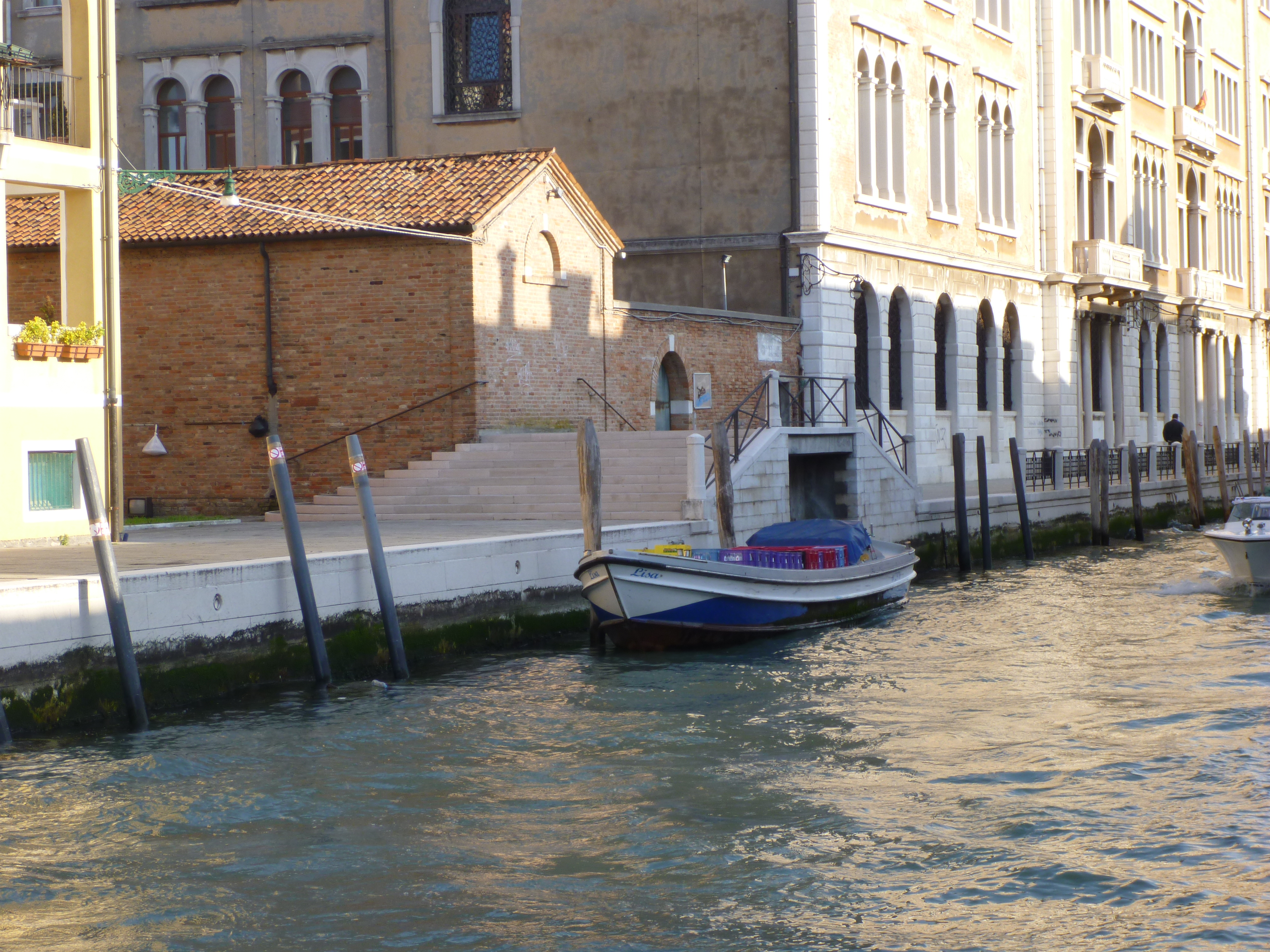
Ponte de la Cavana del Gas
Rio de Santa Giustina

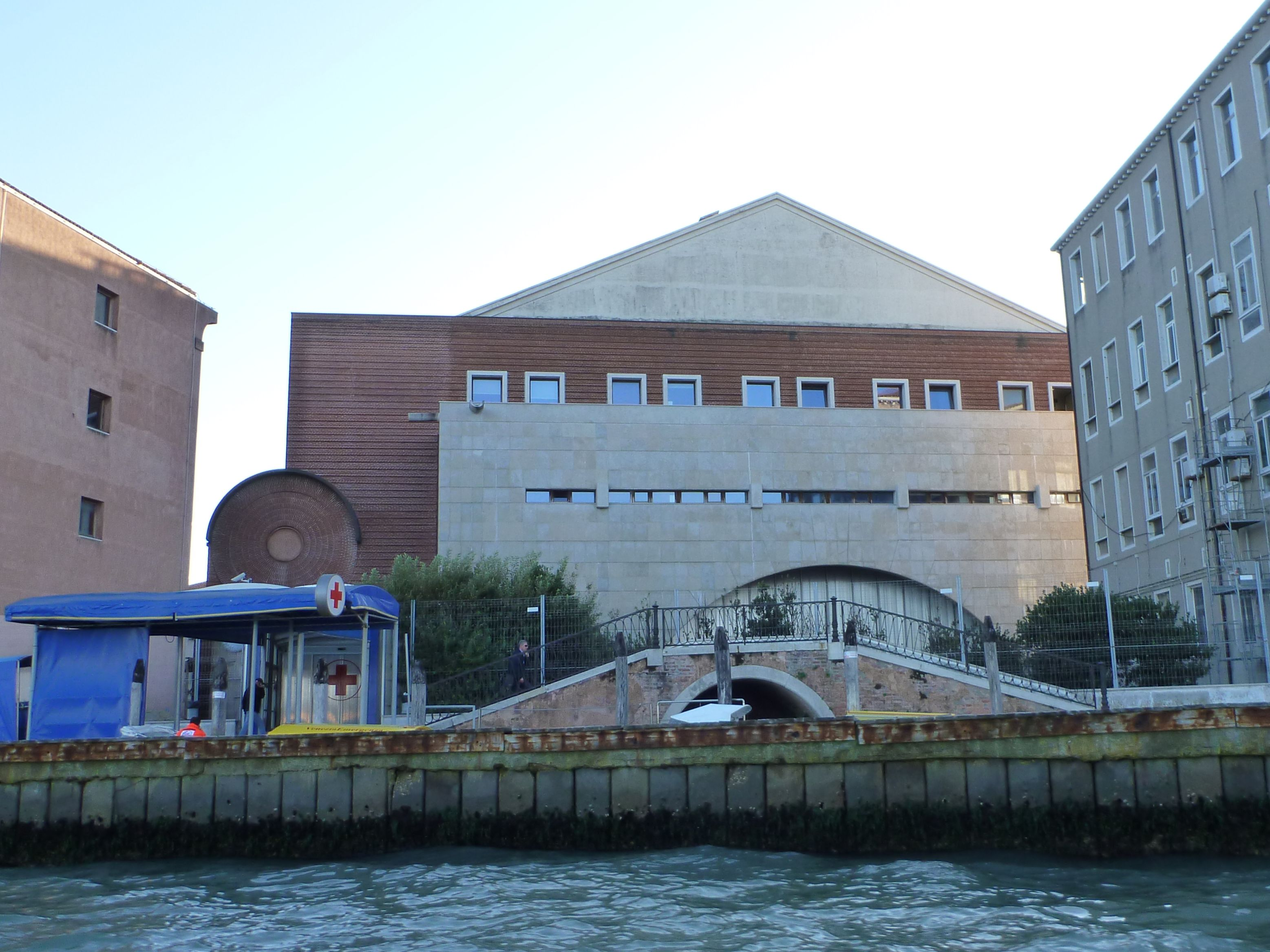
Ponte della Cavana dell'Ospedale

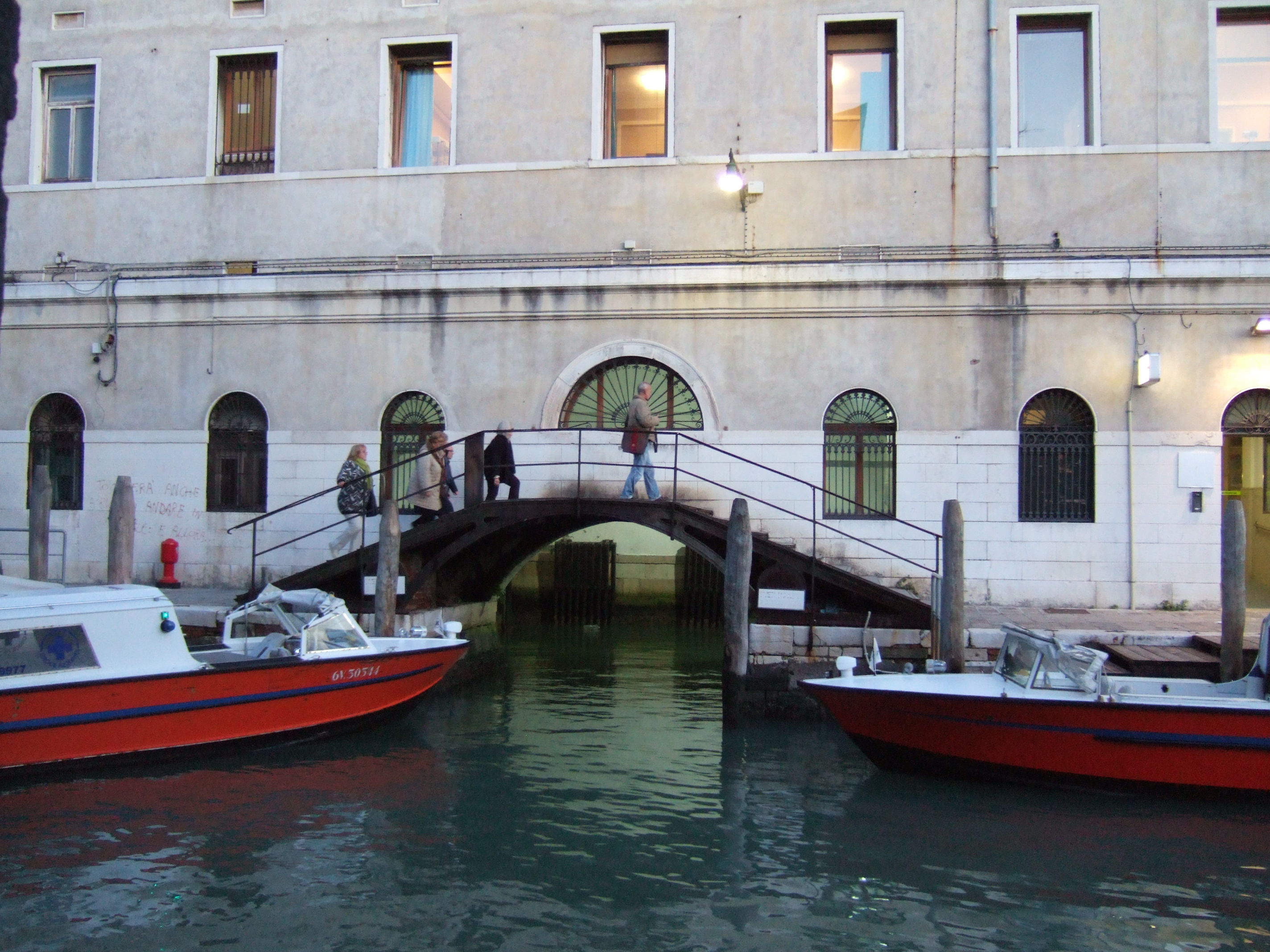
Ponte della Cavana dell'Ospedale
// Rio dei Mendicanti

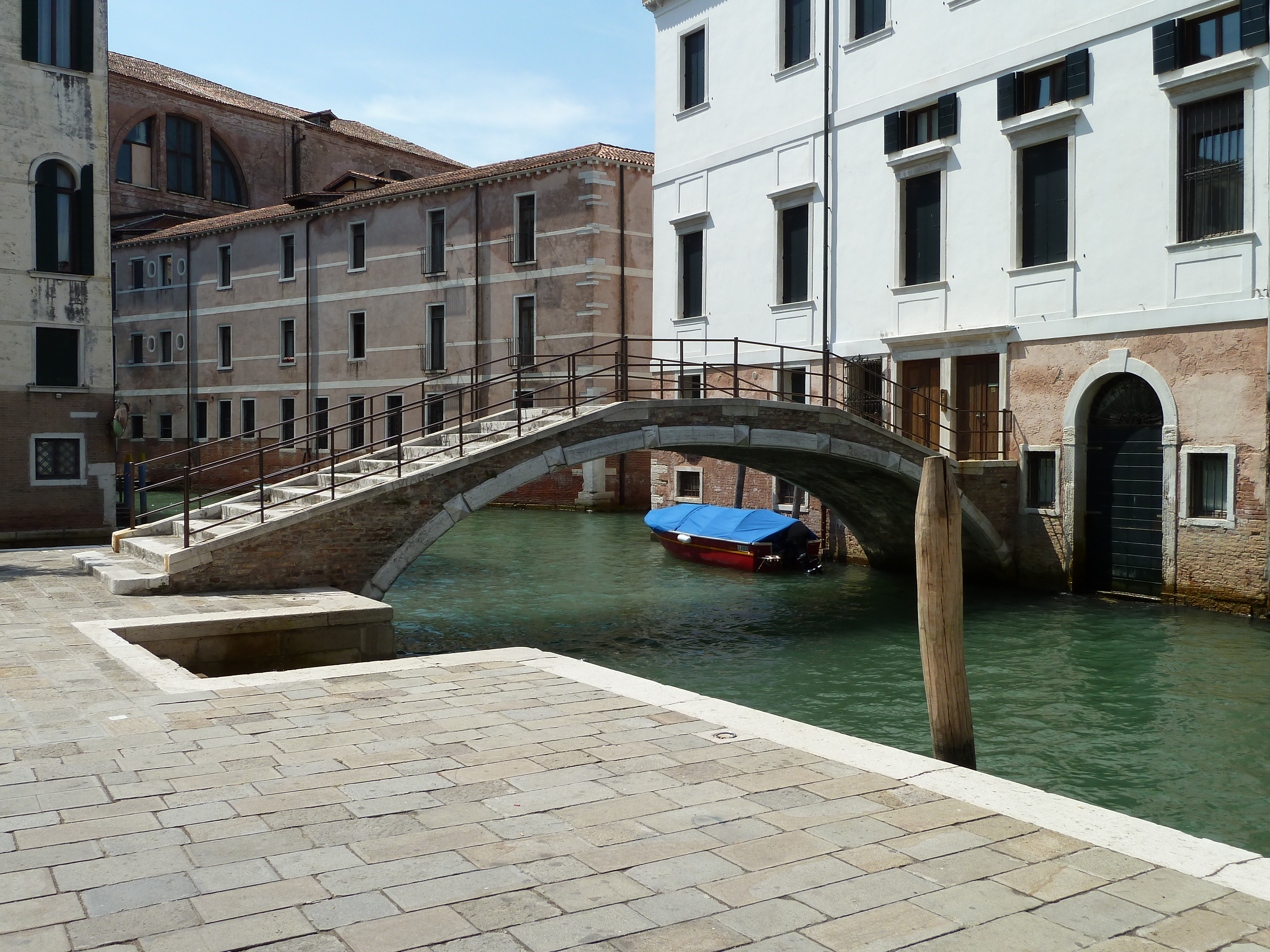
Ponte de Ca' Zon
Rio de Santa Giustina

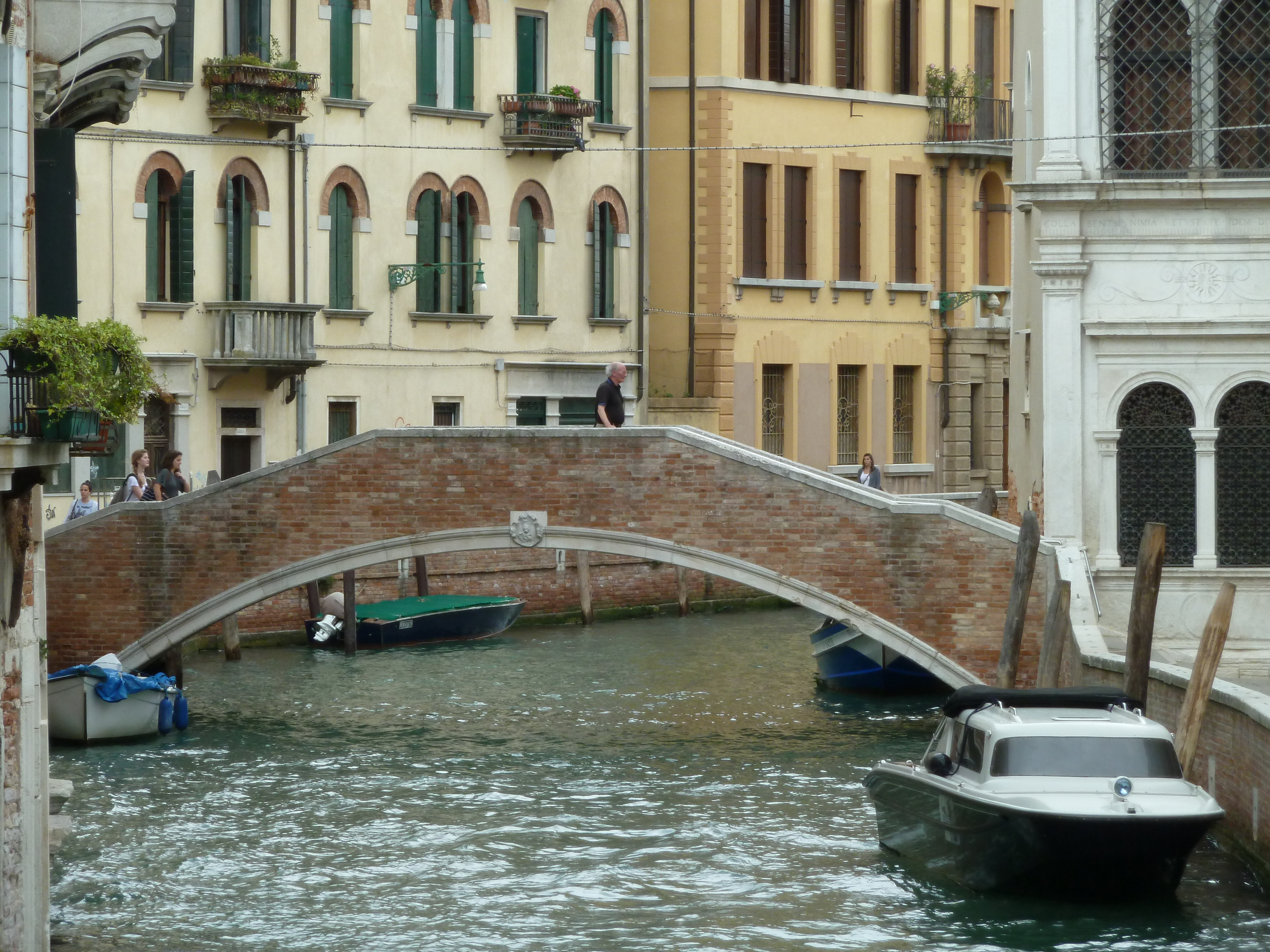
Ponte de la Comenda
Rio de Sant'Antonin

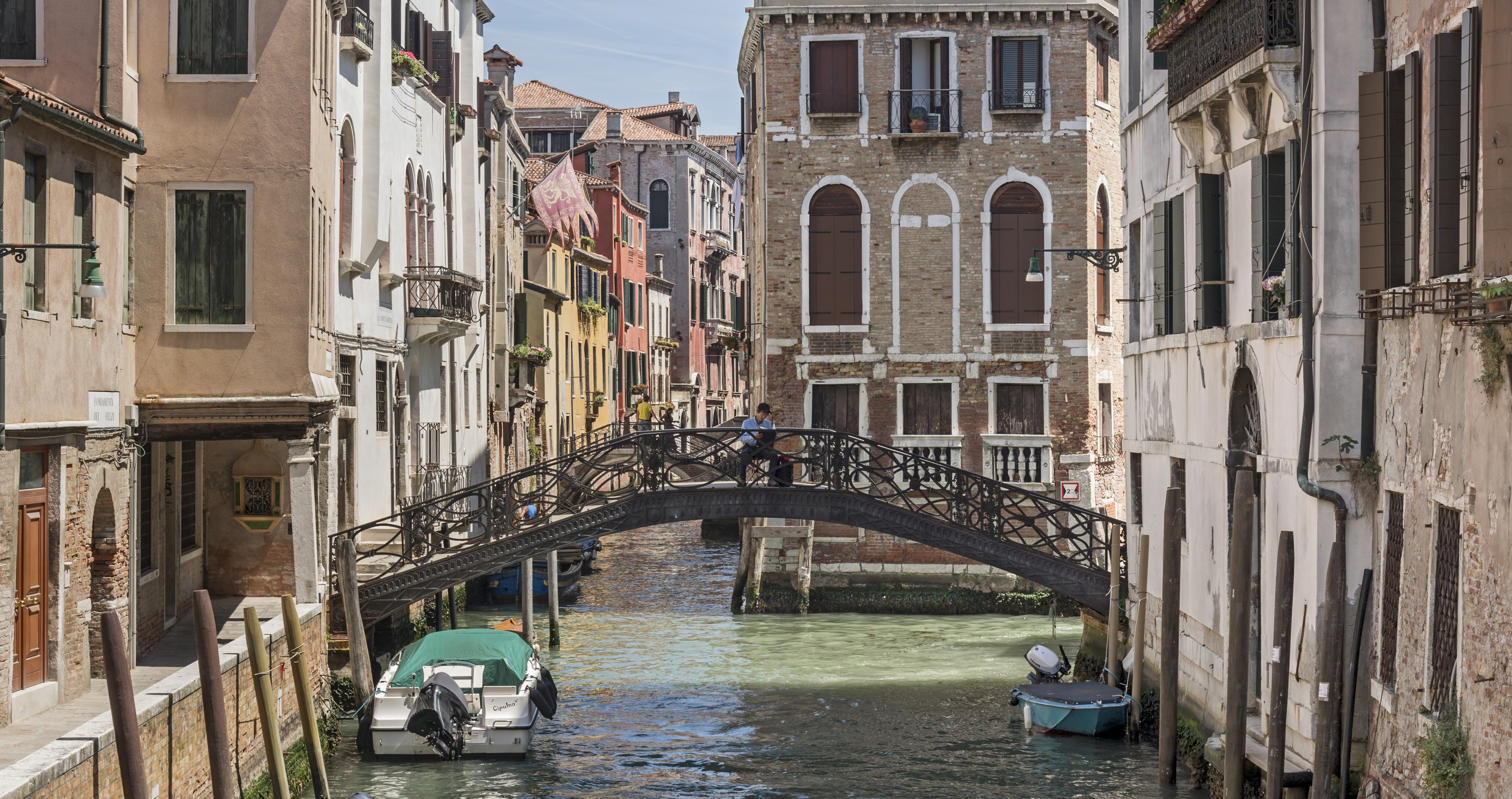
Ponte dei Conzafelzi
Rio del Pestrin

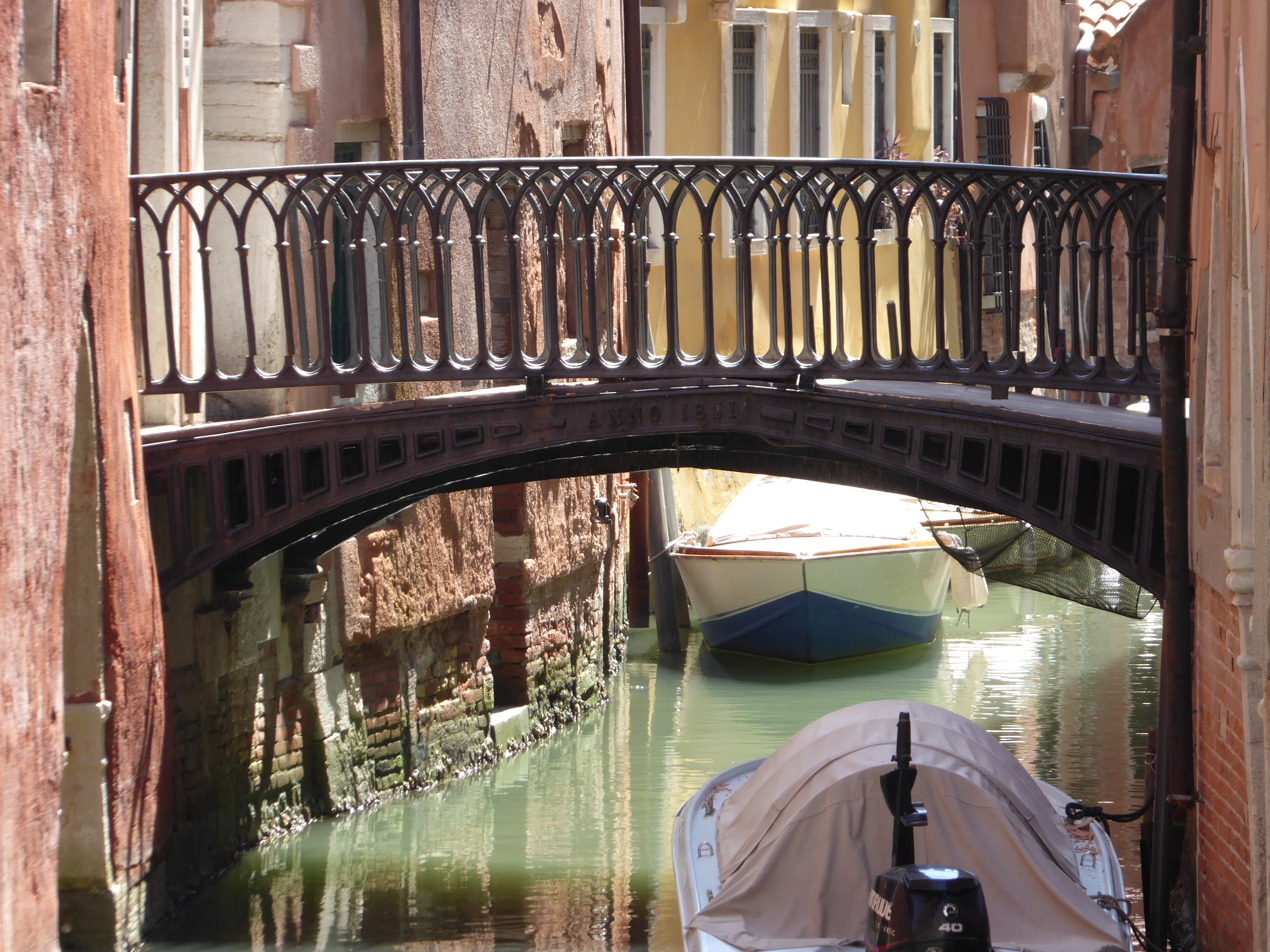
Ponte de la Corona
Rio de San Zaninovo

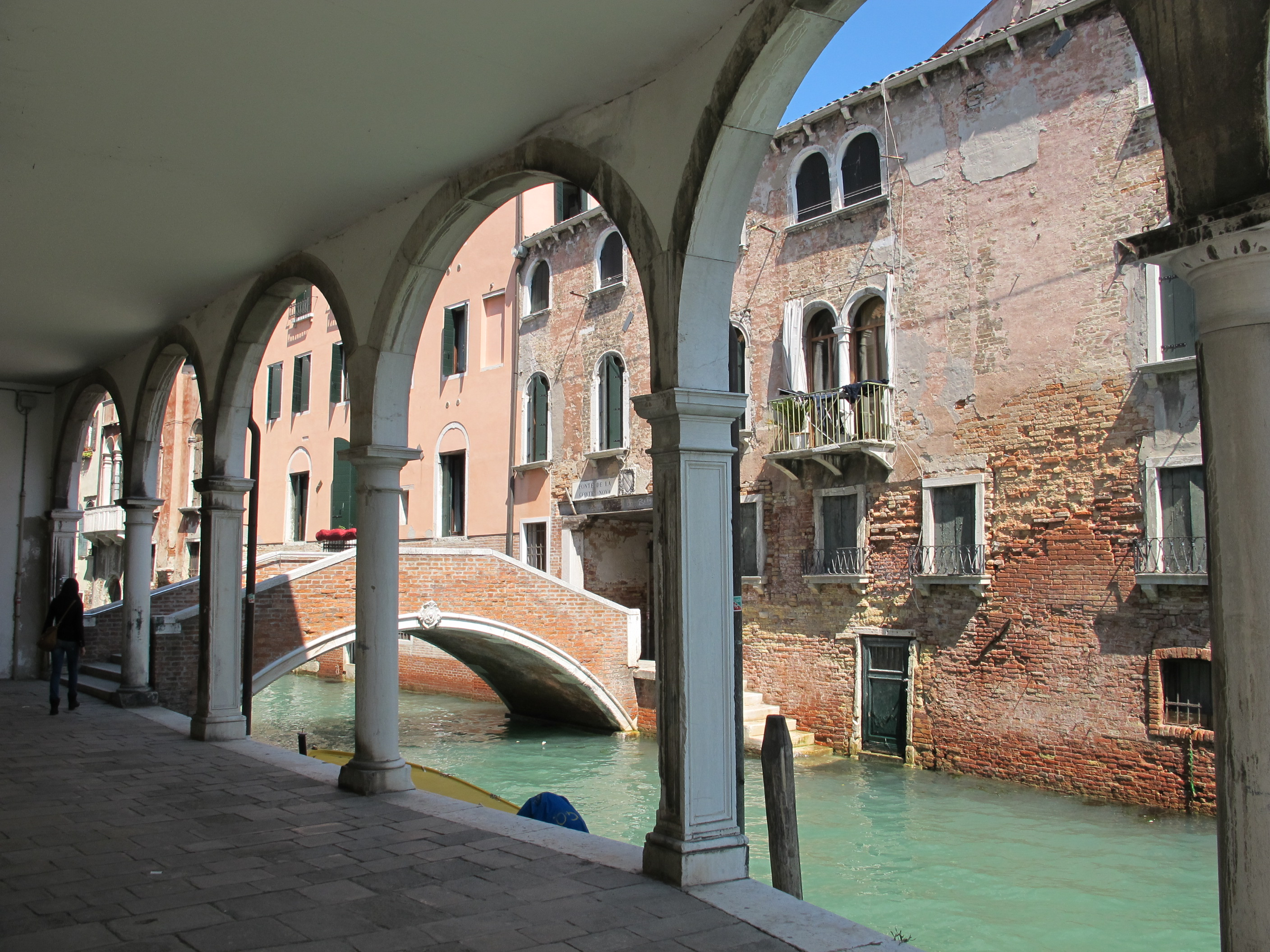
Ponte de la Corte Nova
Rio de Sant'Antonin

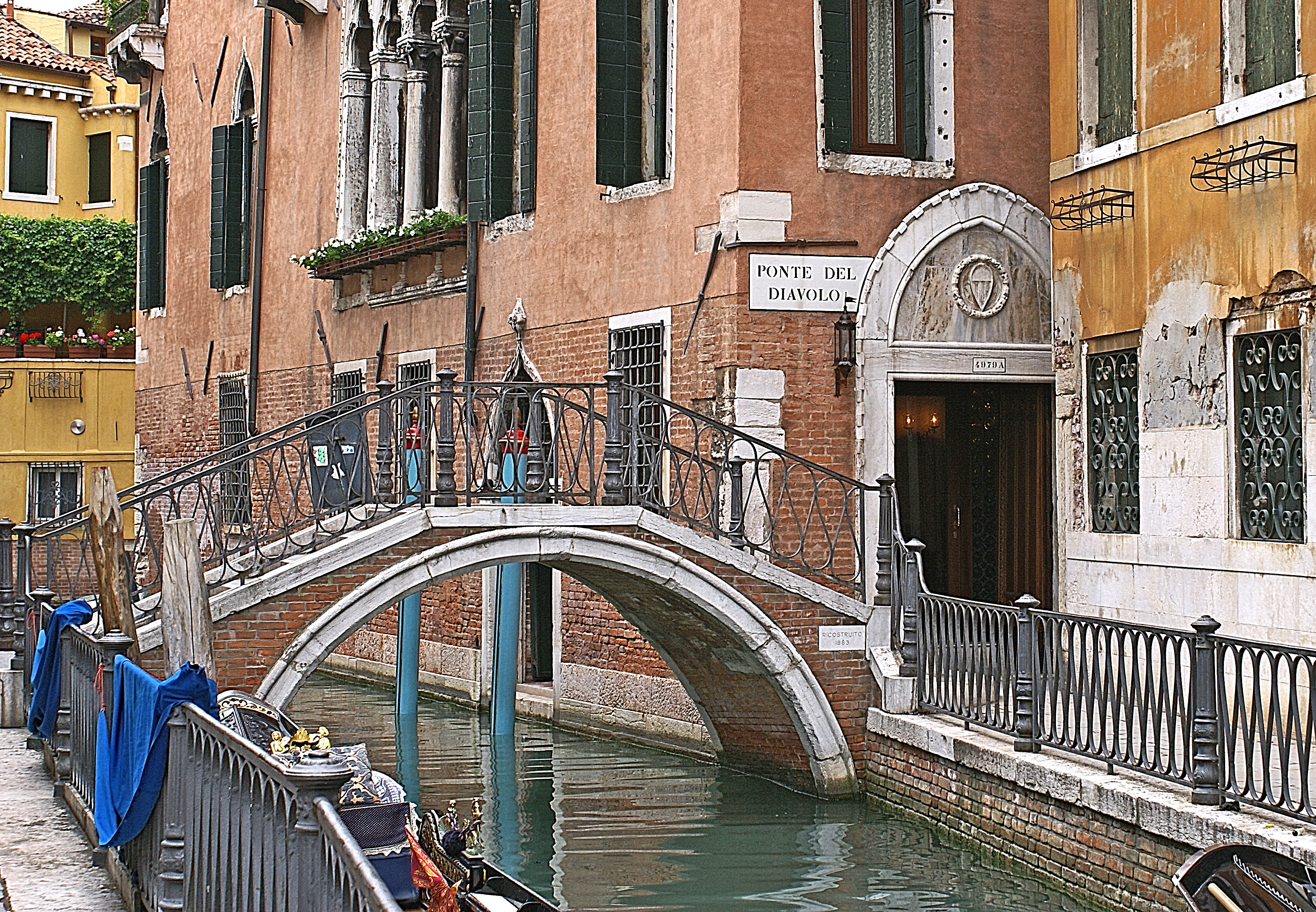
Ponte del Diavolo
Rio de San Provolo

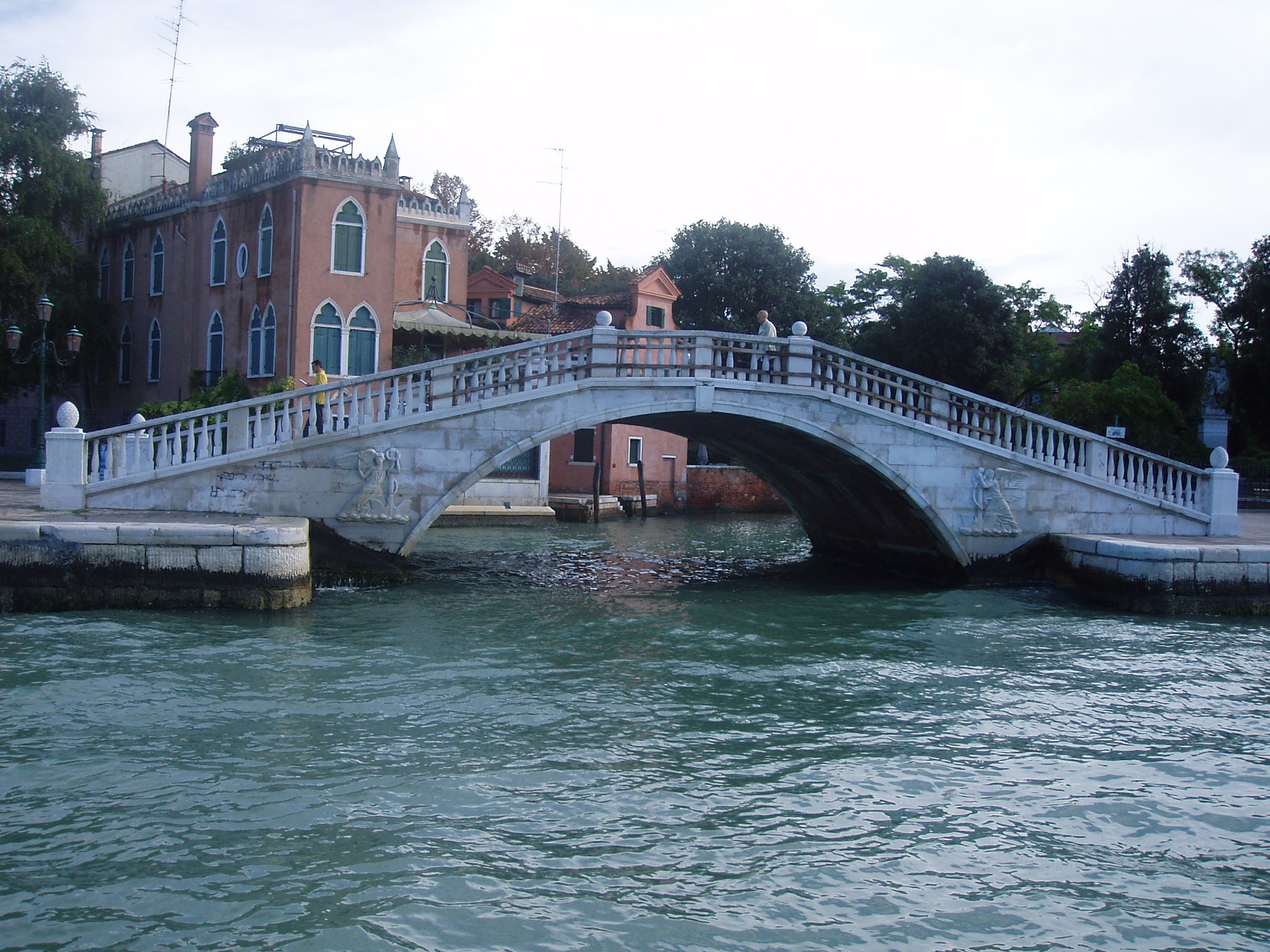
Ponte San Domenego
Rio de Sant'Isepo

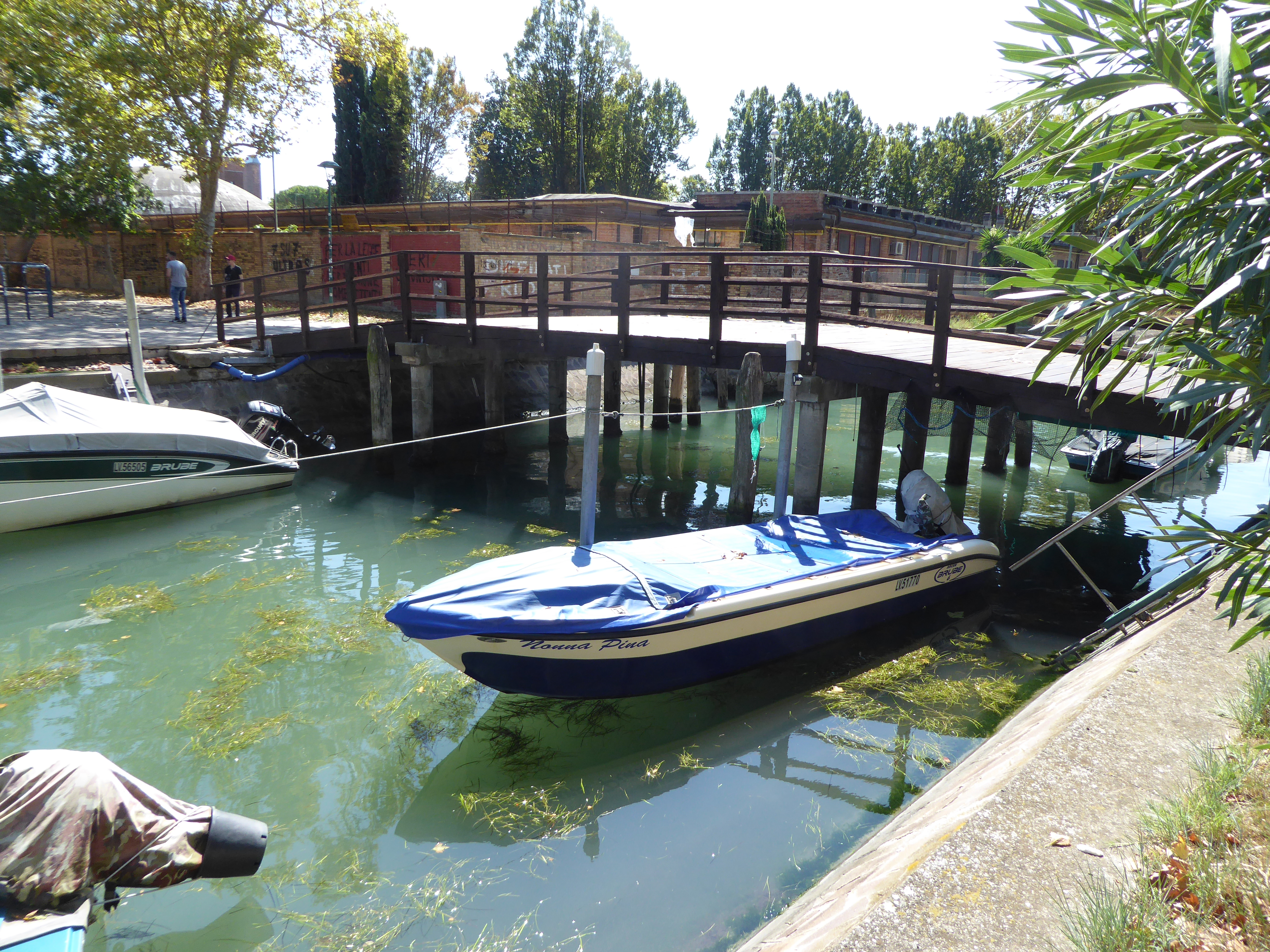
Ponte Sant' Elena
Rio di Sant'Elena

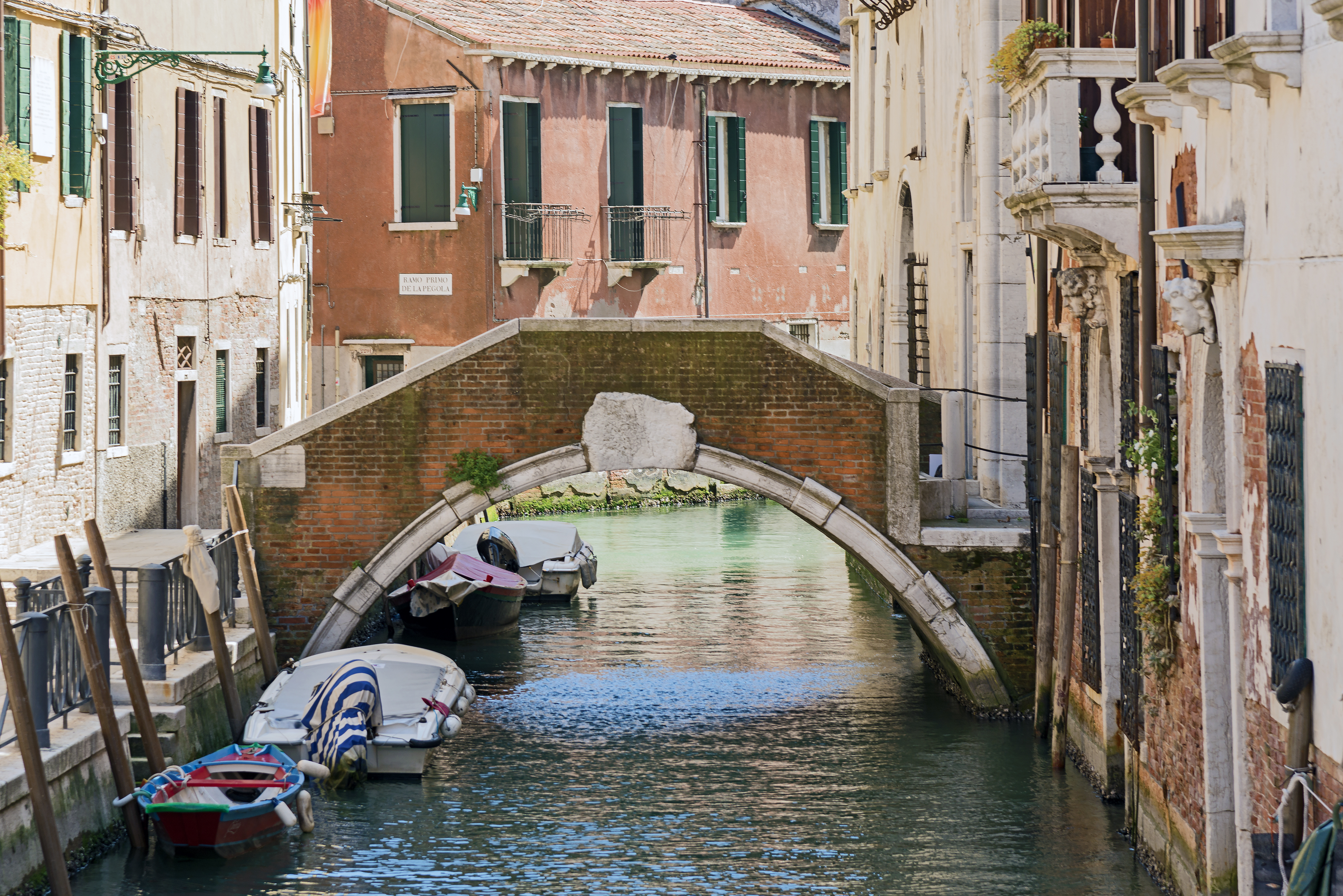
Ponte Erizzo
Rio de la Ca' di Dio

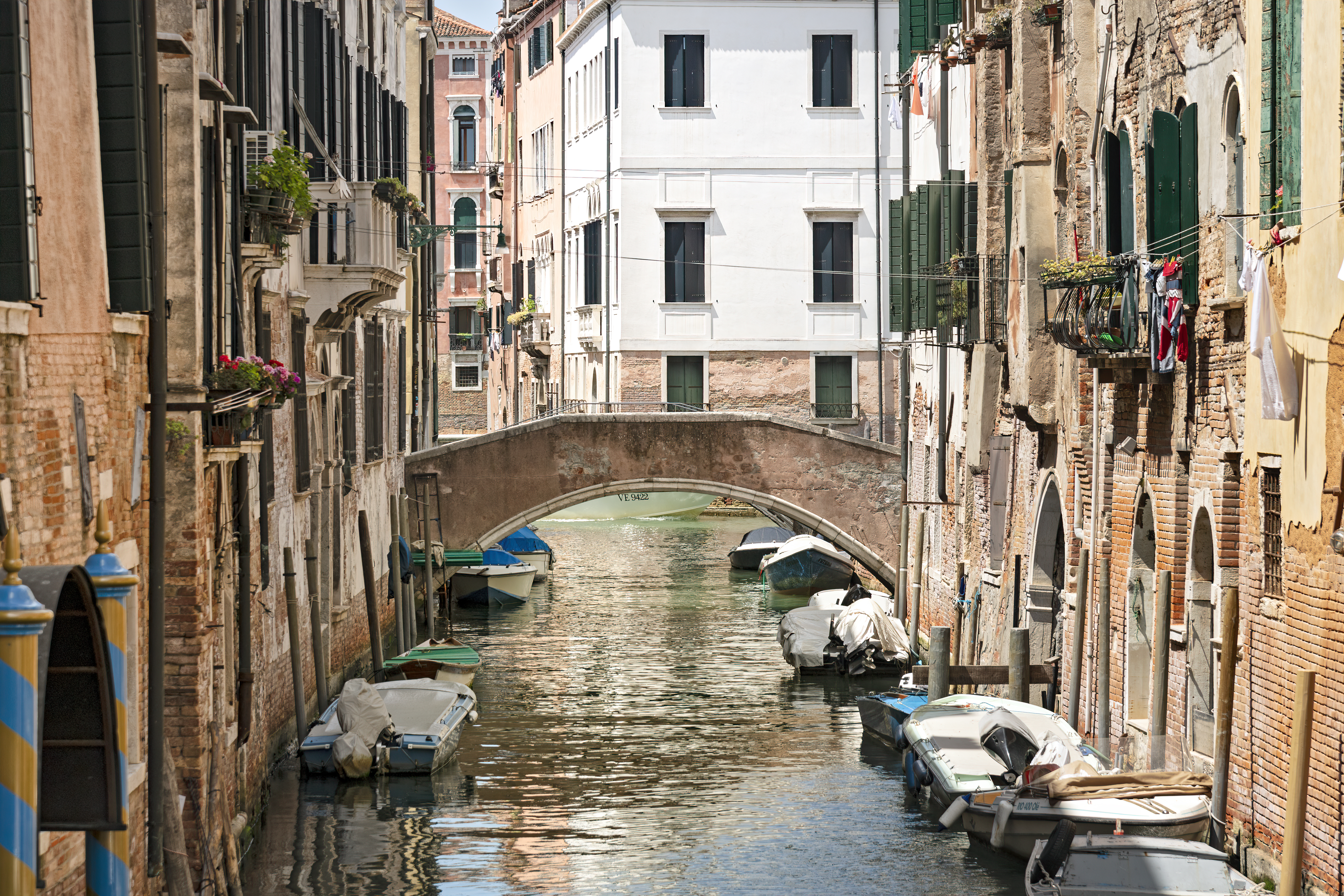
Ponte del Fontego
Rio de San Francesco

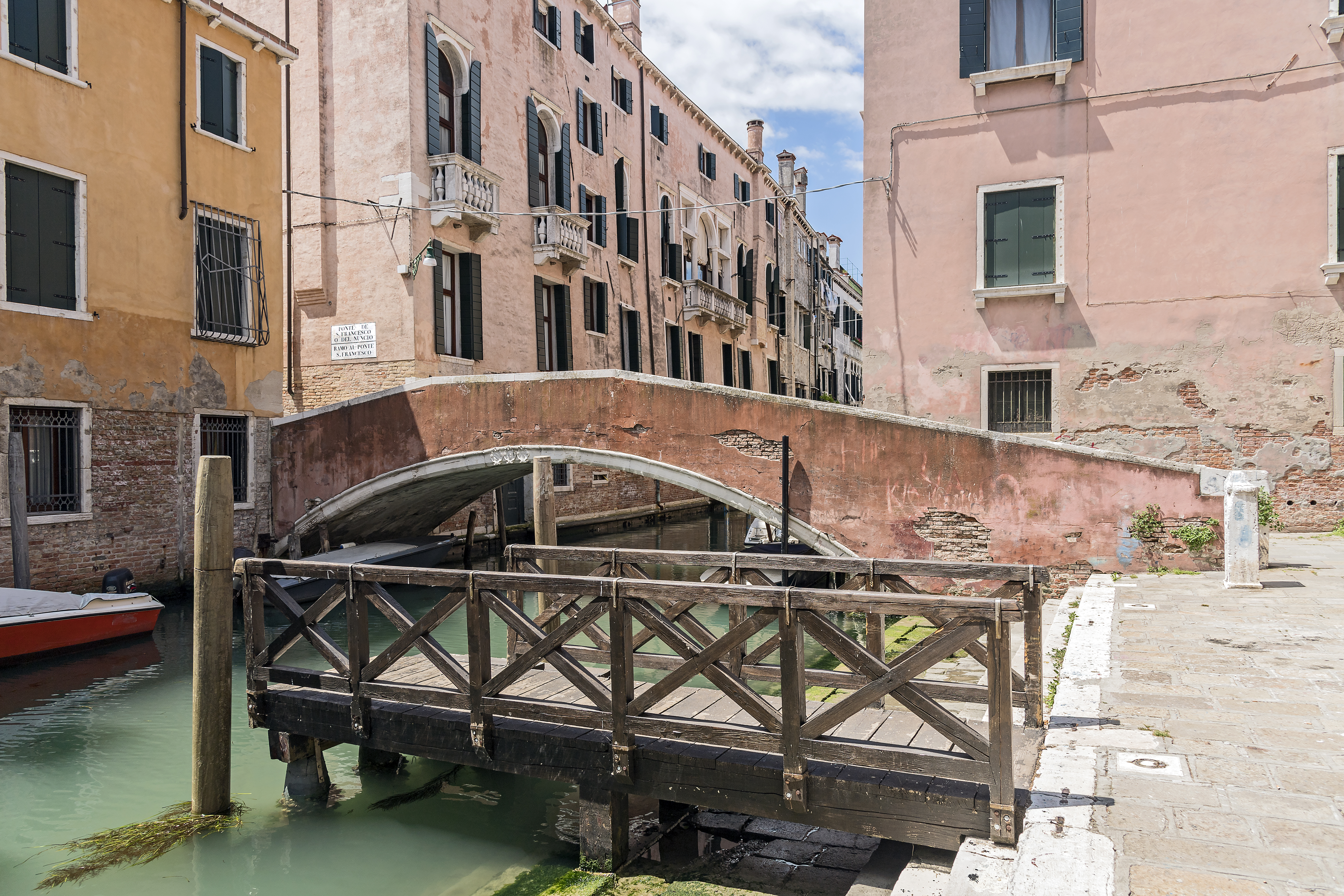
Ponte San Francesco ou del Nuncio
Rio de San Francesco

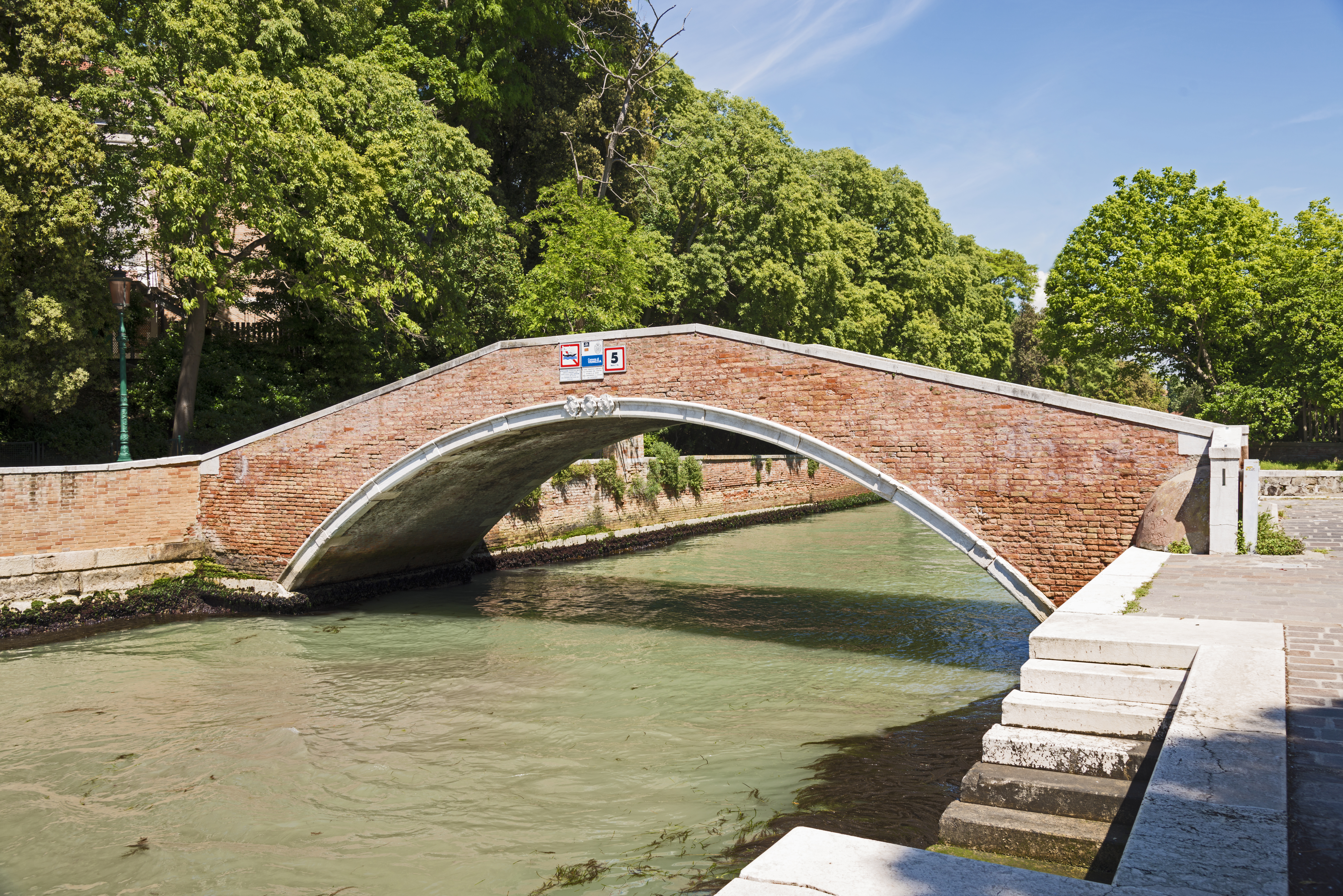
Ponte dei Giardini
Rio dei Giardini (Sant’Elena)

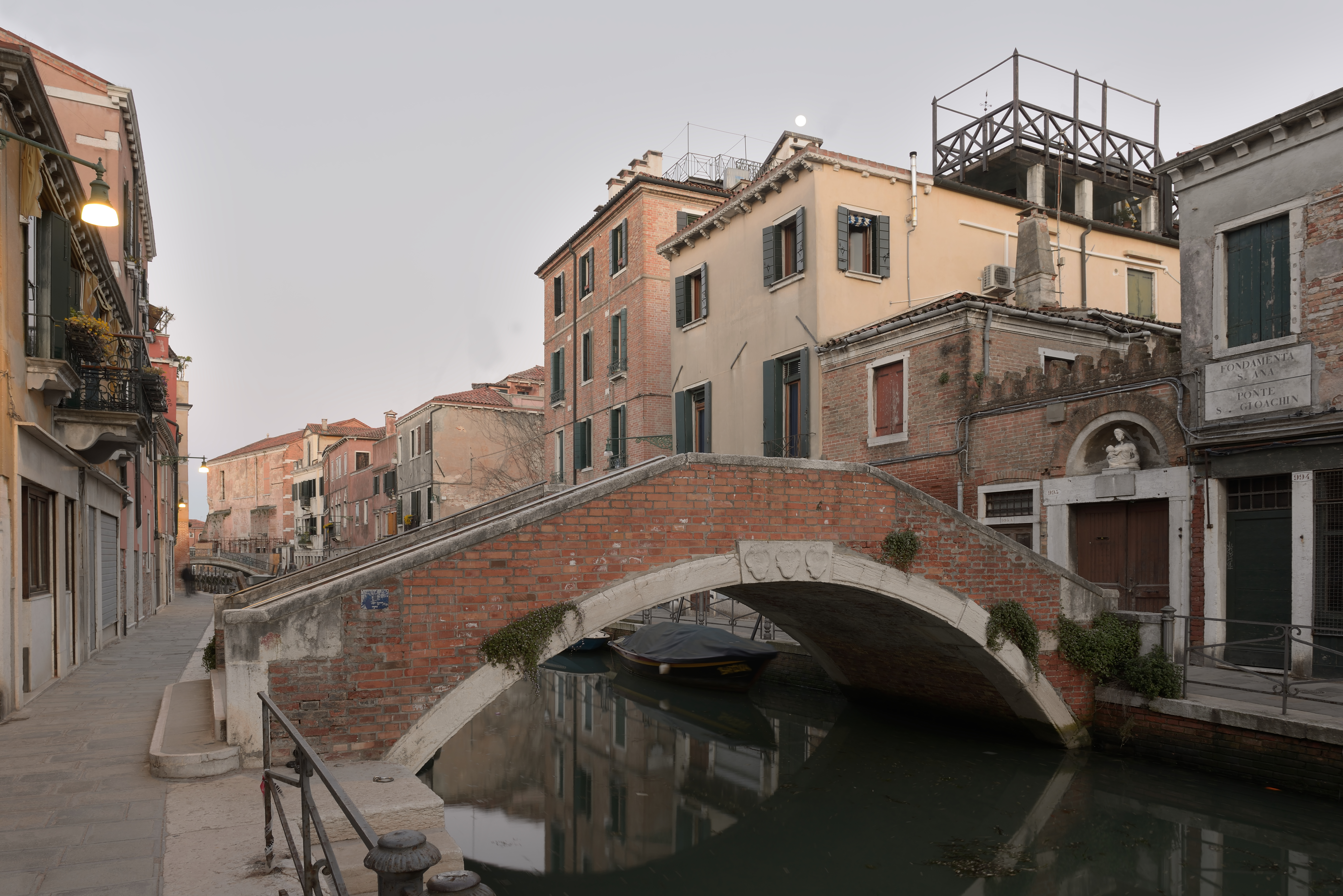
Ponte San Gioachin(o)
Rio de Sant'Ana

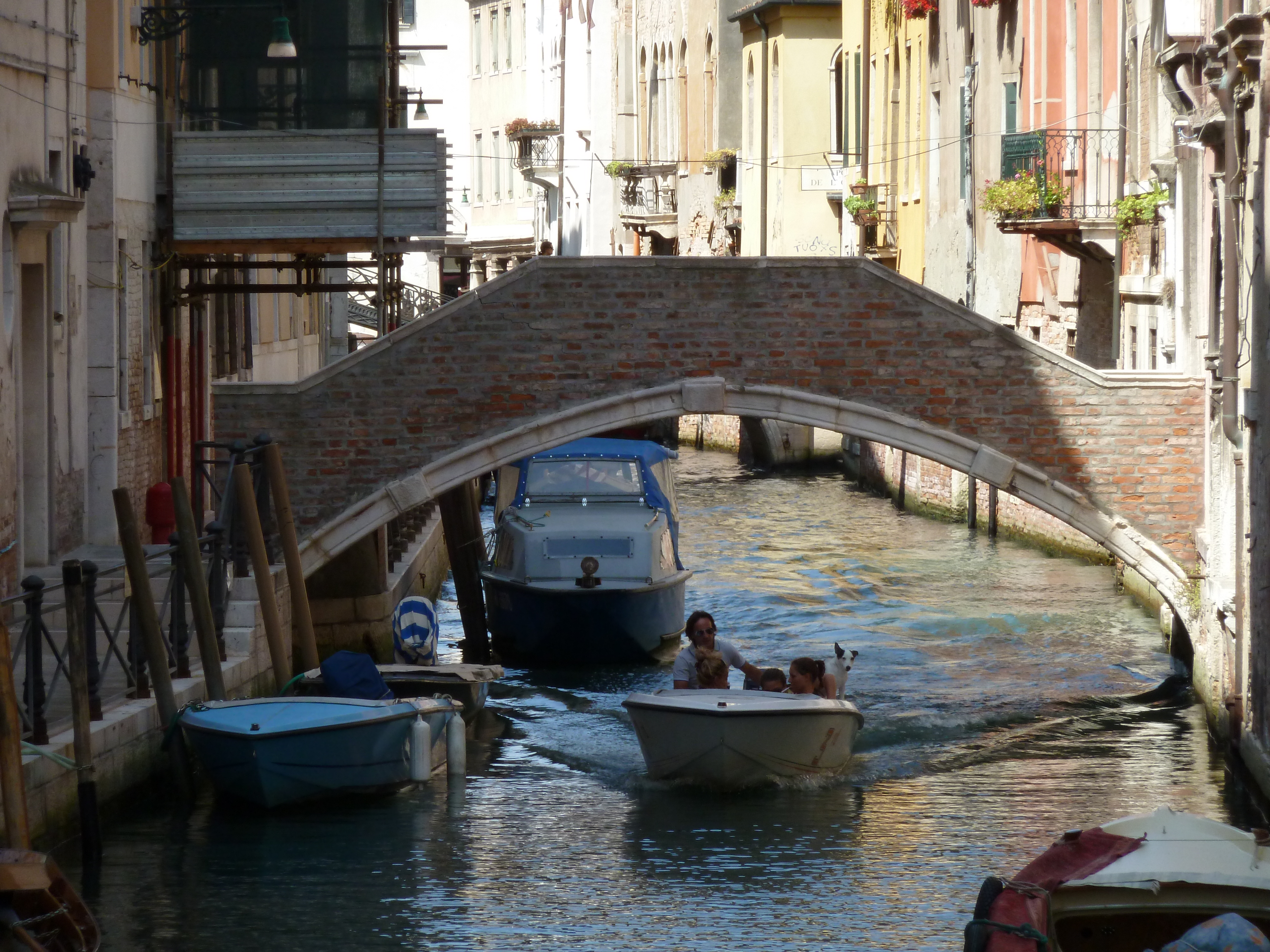
Ponte San Giovanni
Rio de San Giovanni Laterano

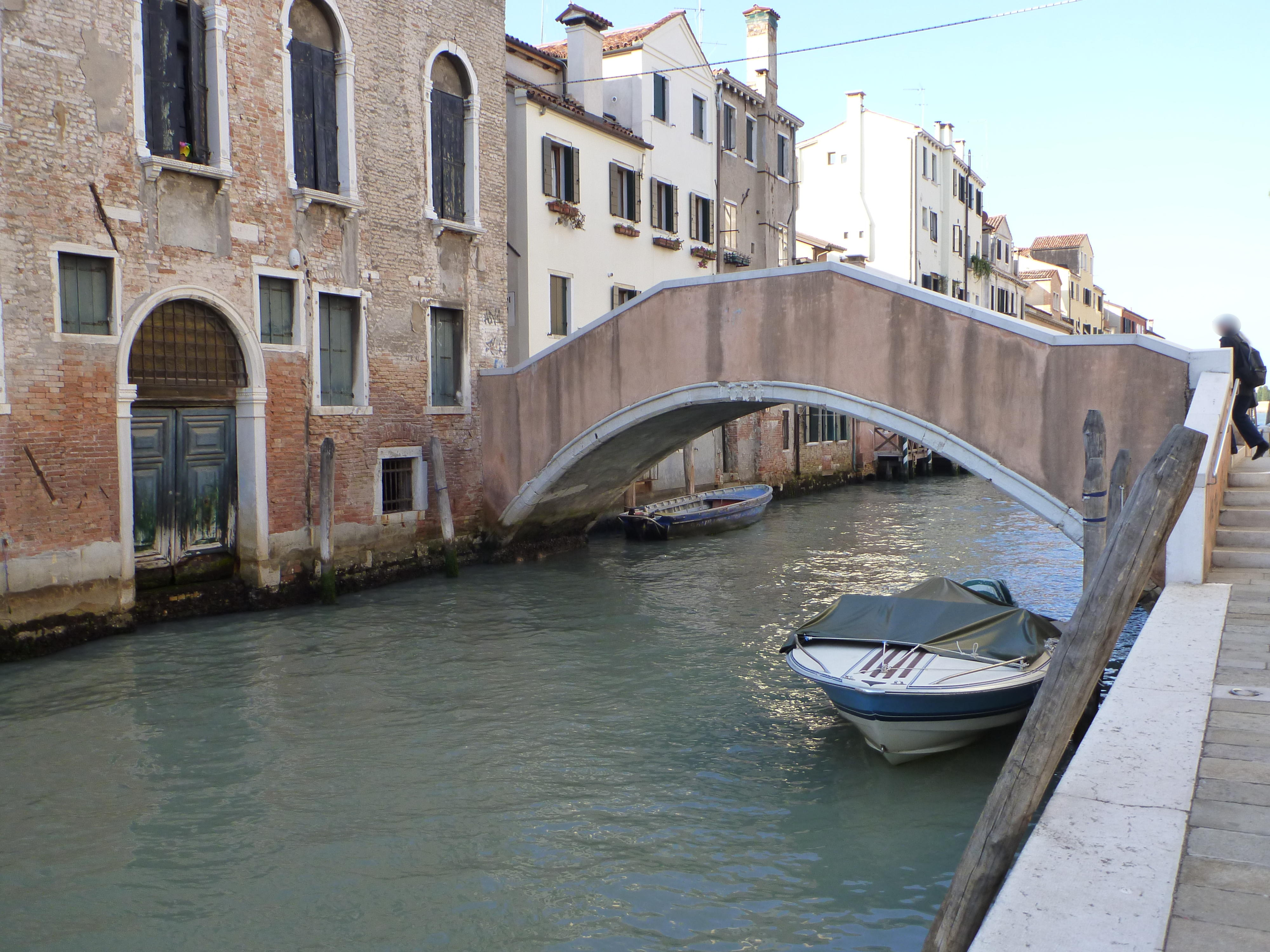
Ponte Santa Giustina
Rio de Santa Giustina

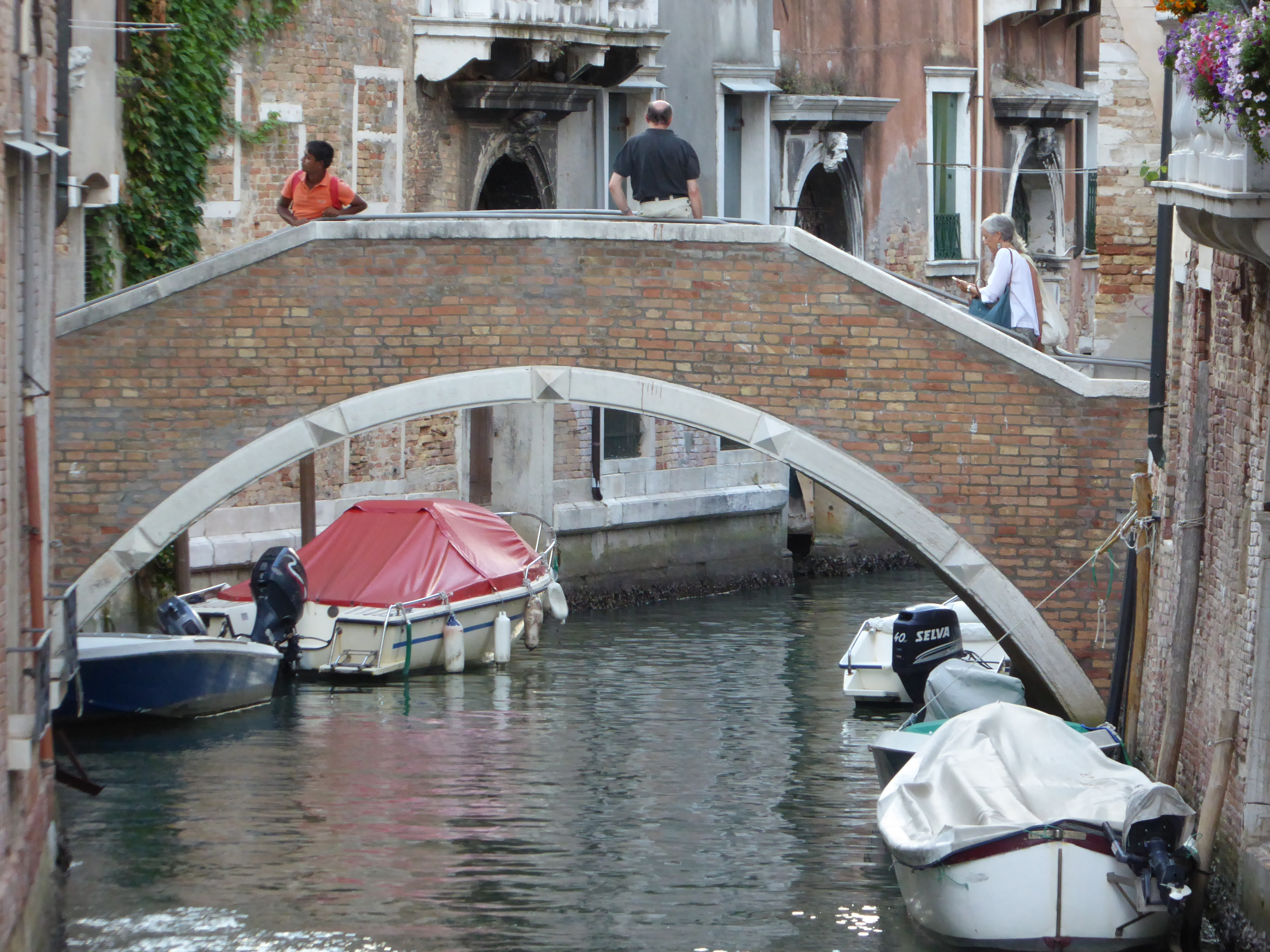
Ponte de la Grana
Rio de San Martin

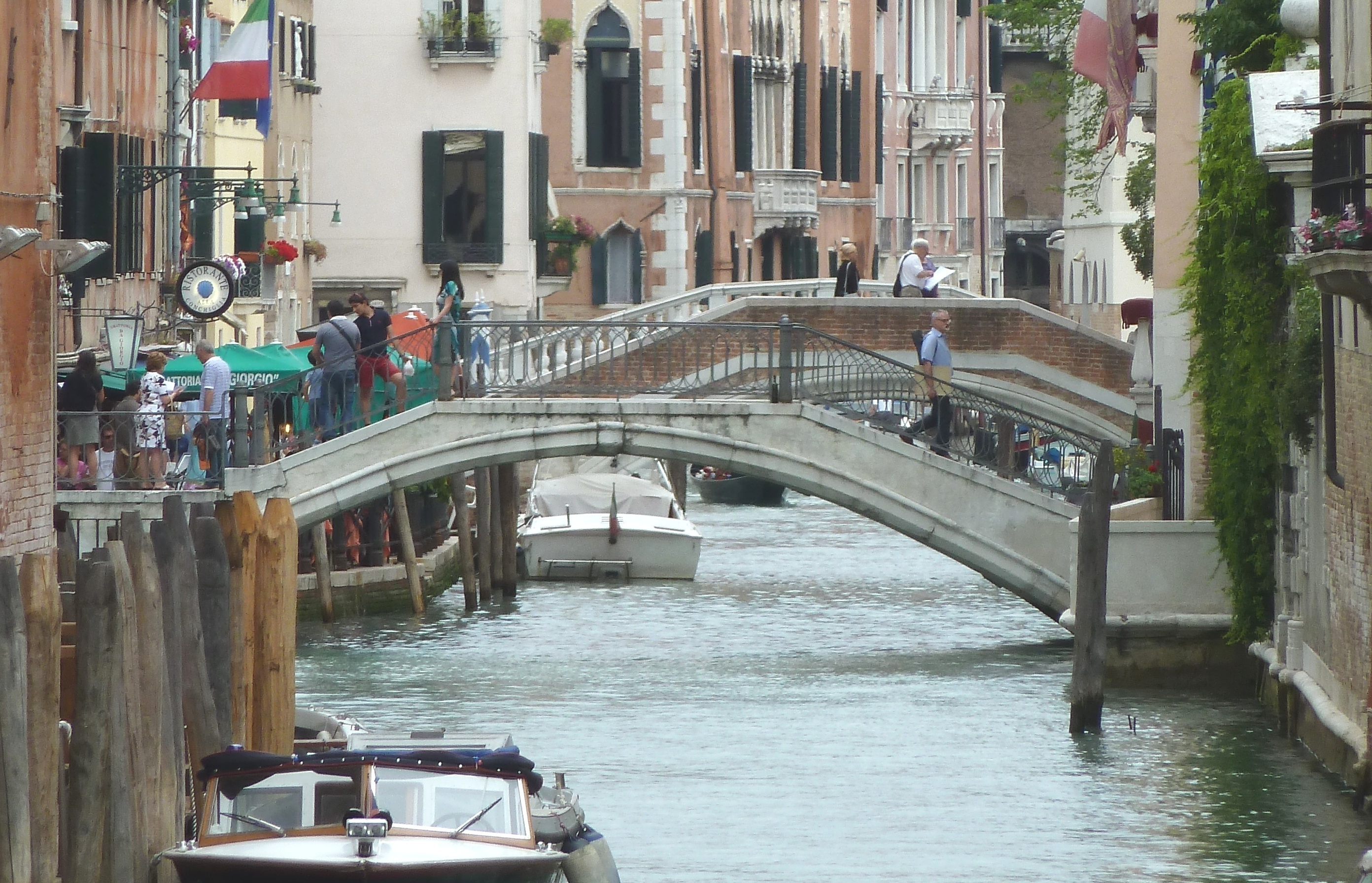
Ponte dei Greci
Rio dei Greci

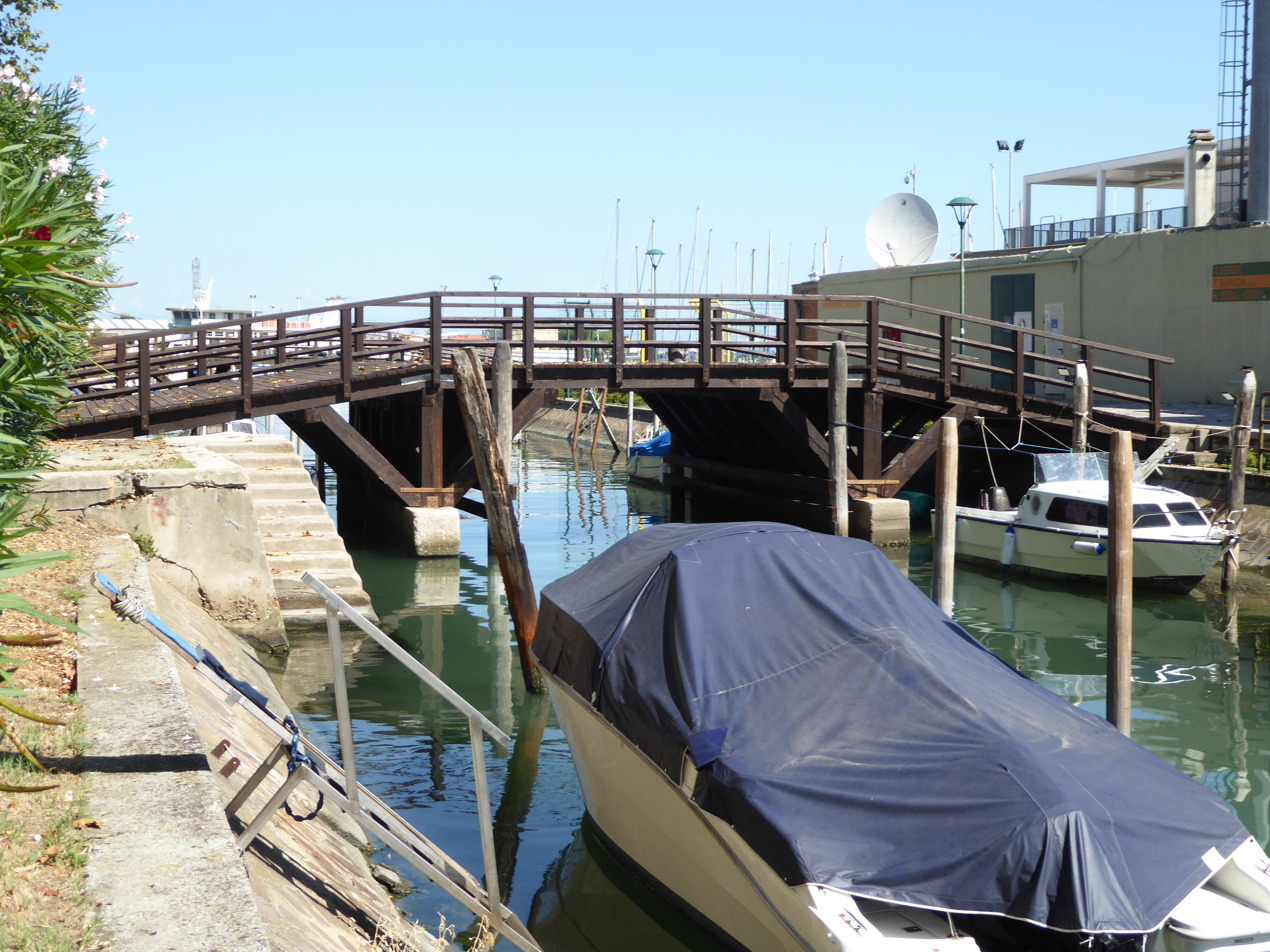
Ponte de l' Hermada
Rio di Sant'Elena

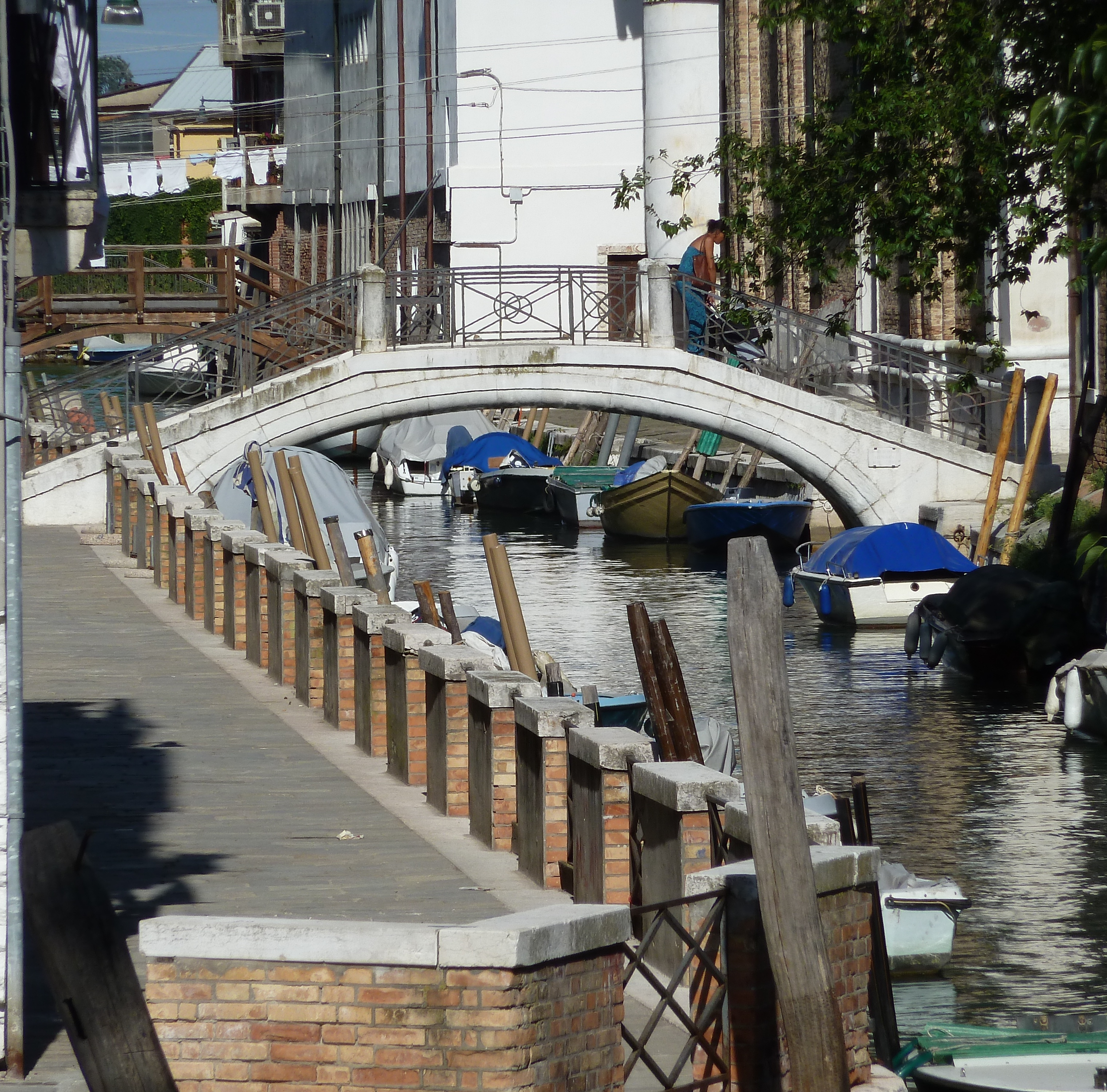
Ponte Sant'Isepo
Rio de Sant'Isepo

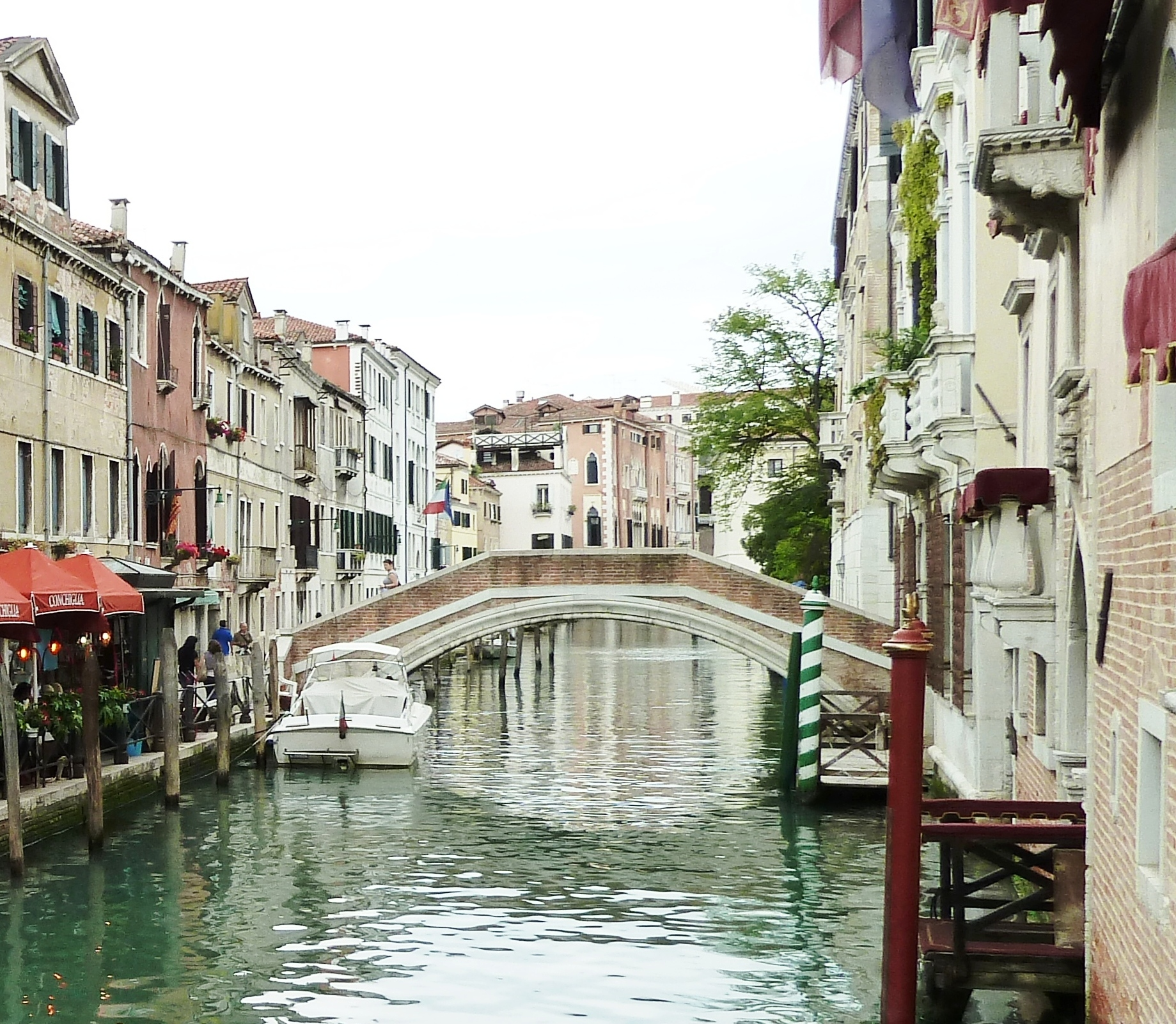
Ponte Lion
Rio de San Lorenzo

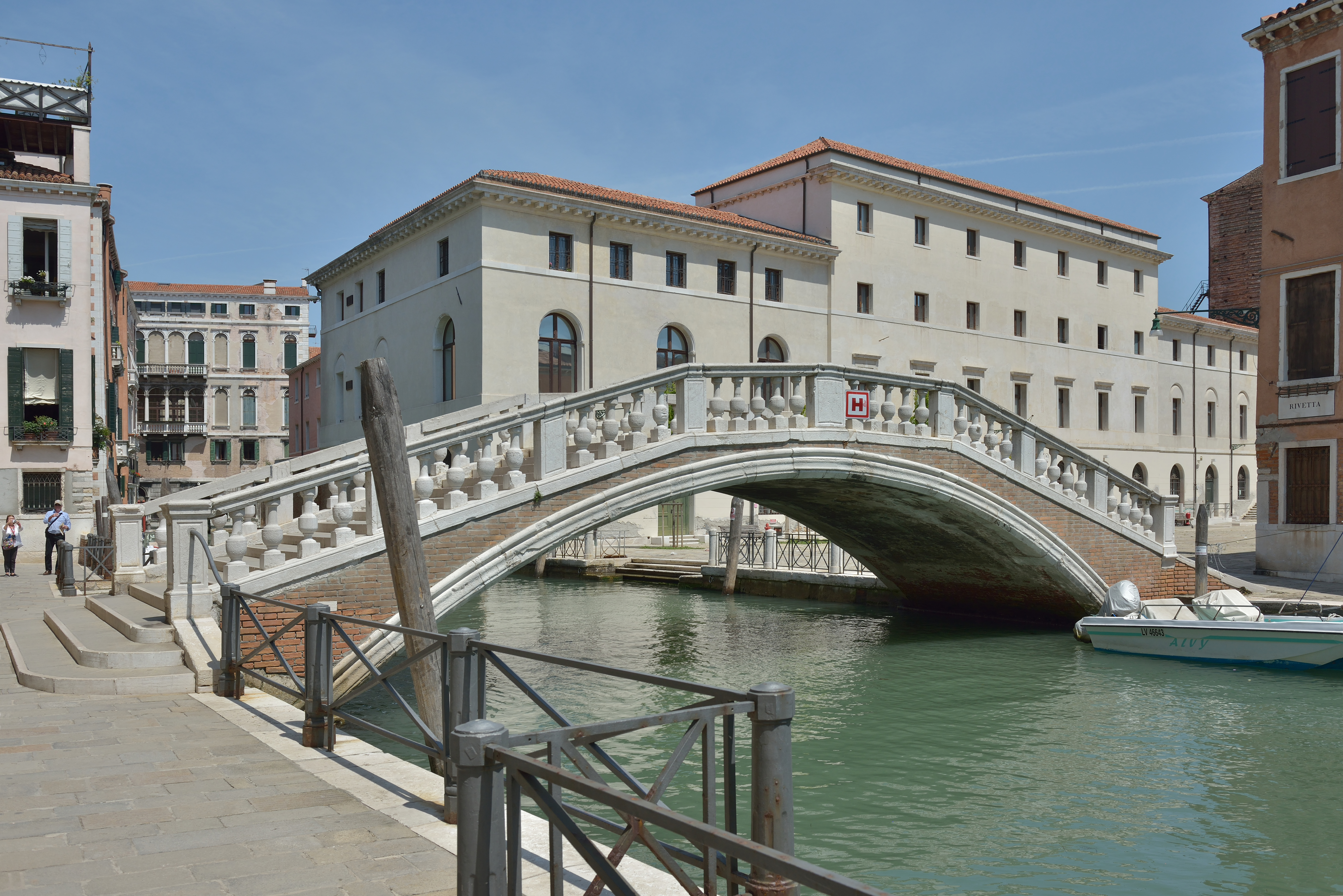
Ponte San Lorenzo
Rio de San Lorenzo

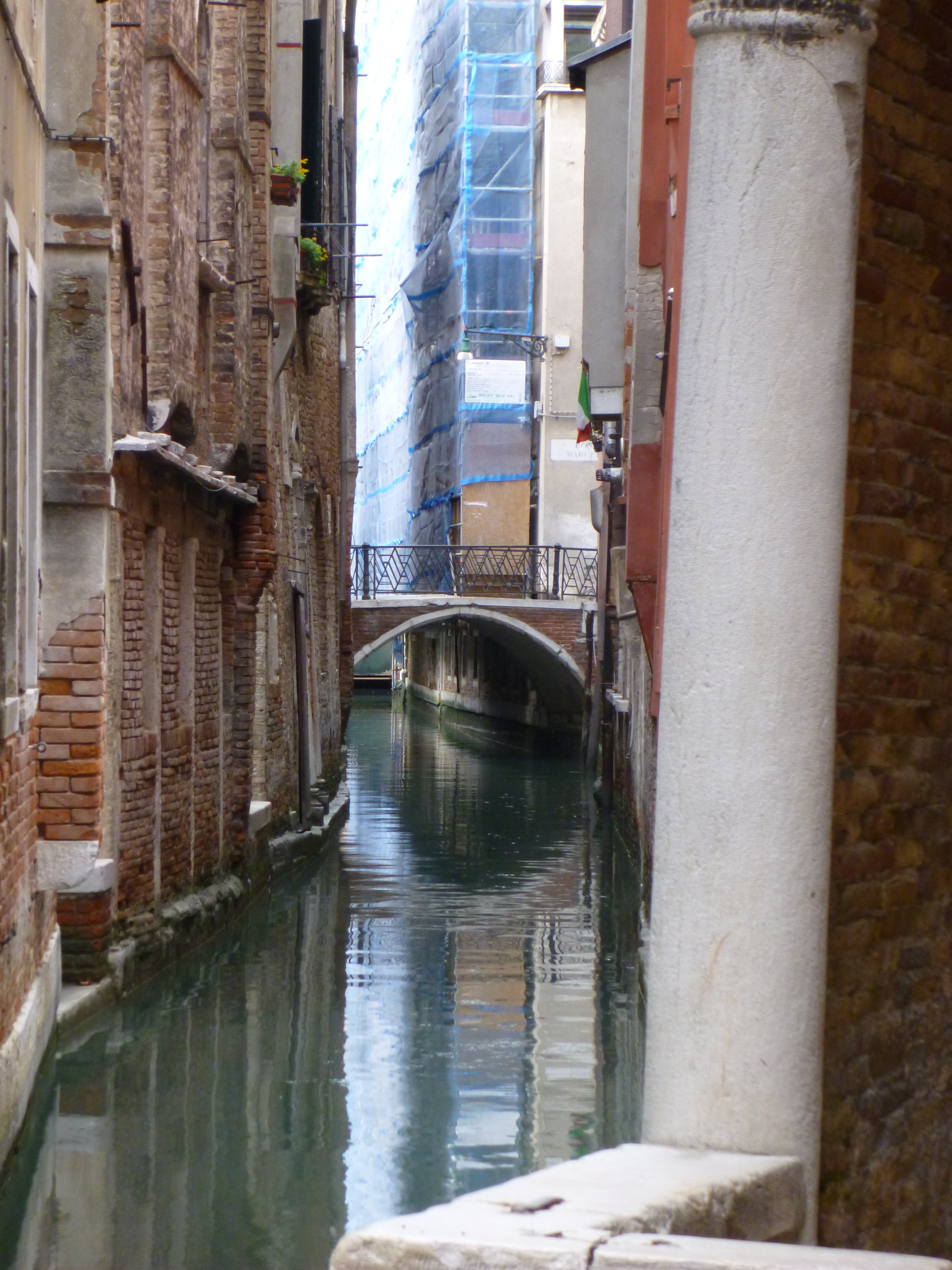
Ponte Marcello ou Pindemonte
Rio del Piombo

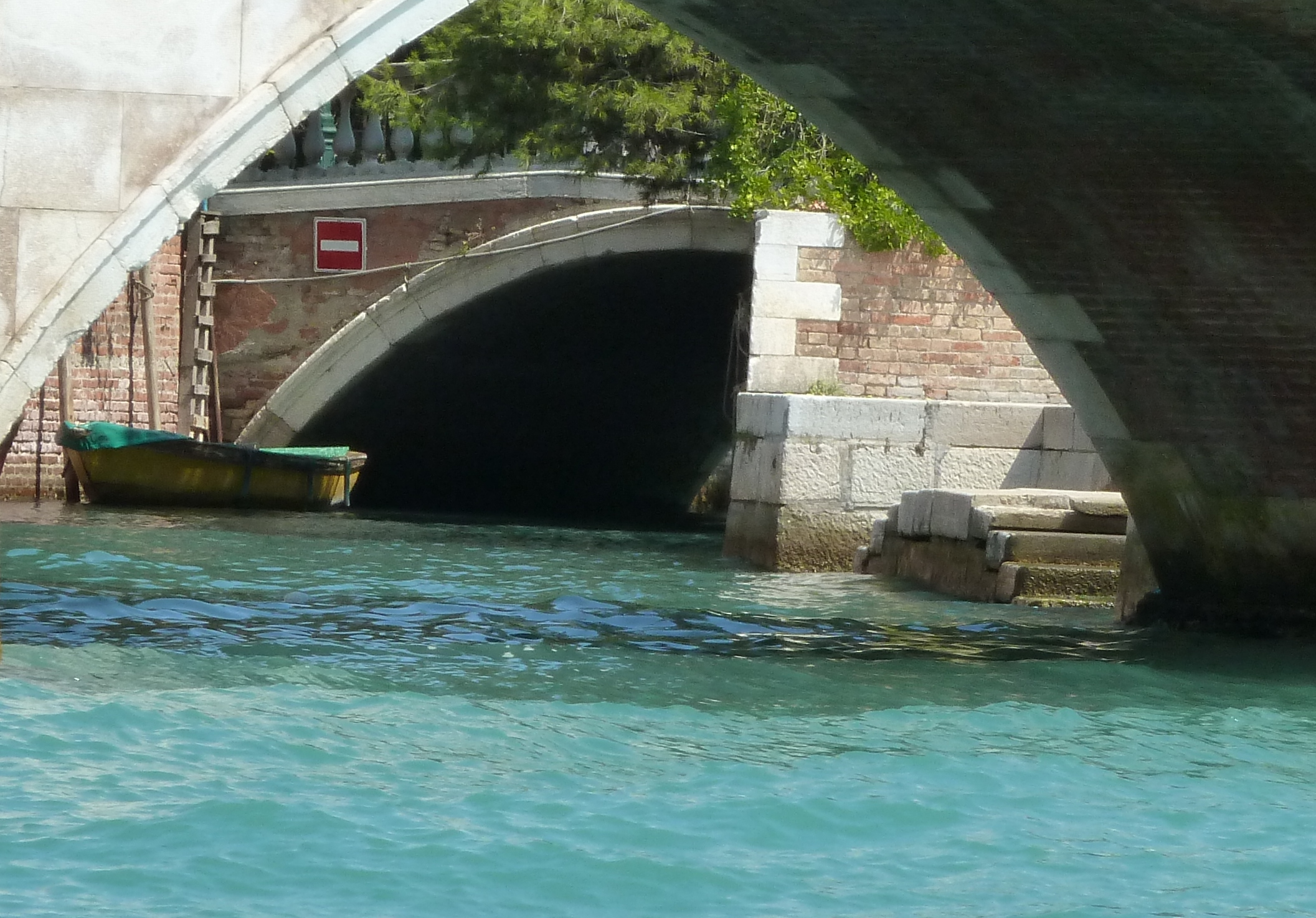
Ponte larga Marinai d'Italia
Rio de Sant'Isepo

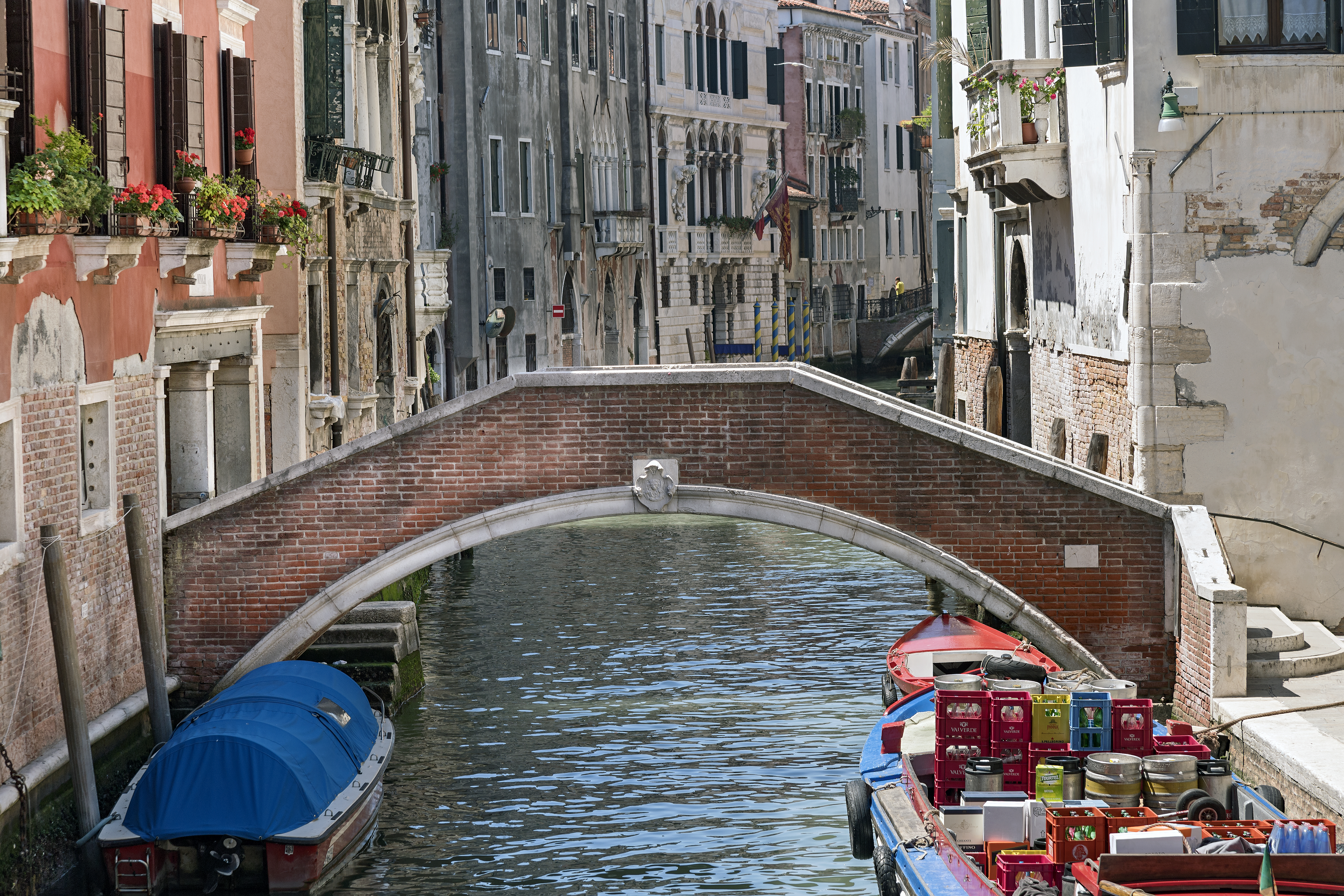
Ponte Minich
Rio del Paradiso

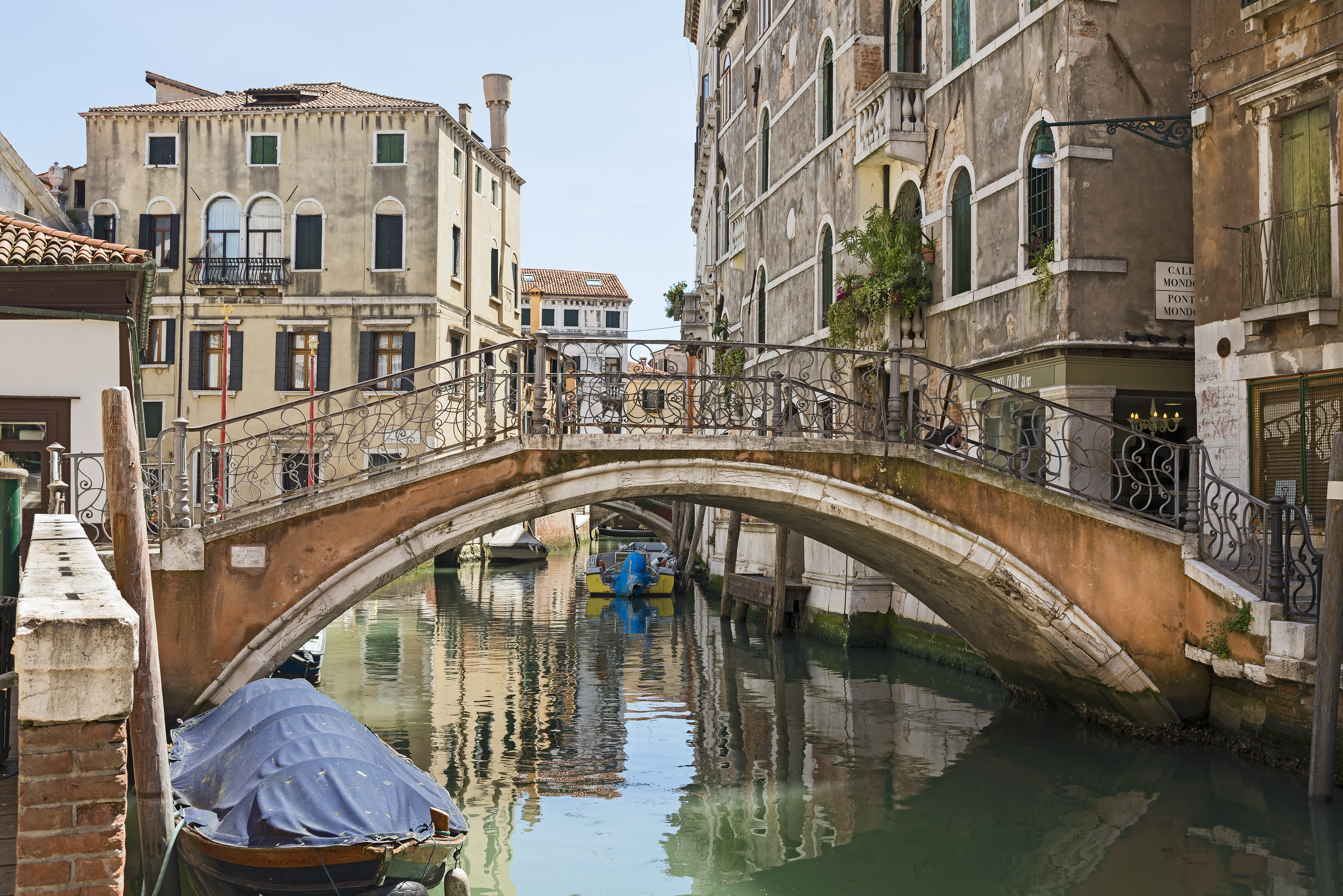
Ponte del Mondo Novo
Rio del Mondo Novo

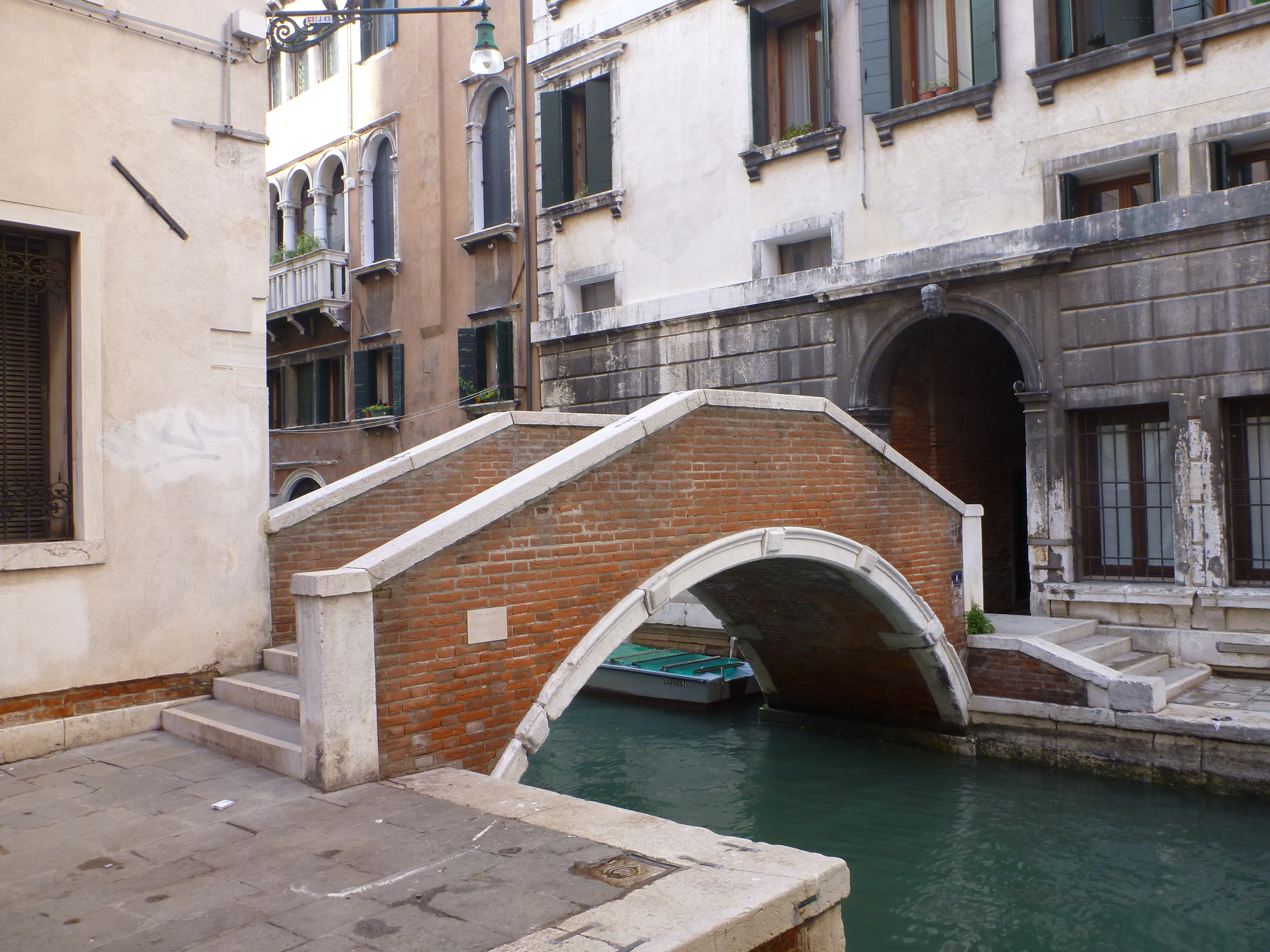
Ponte Muazzo
Rio de San Giovanni Laterano

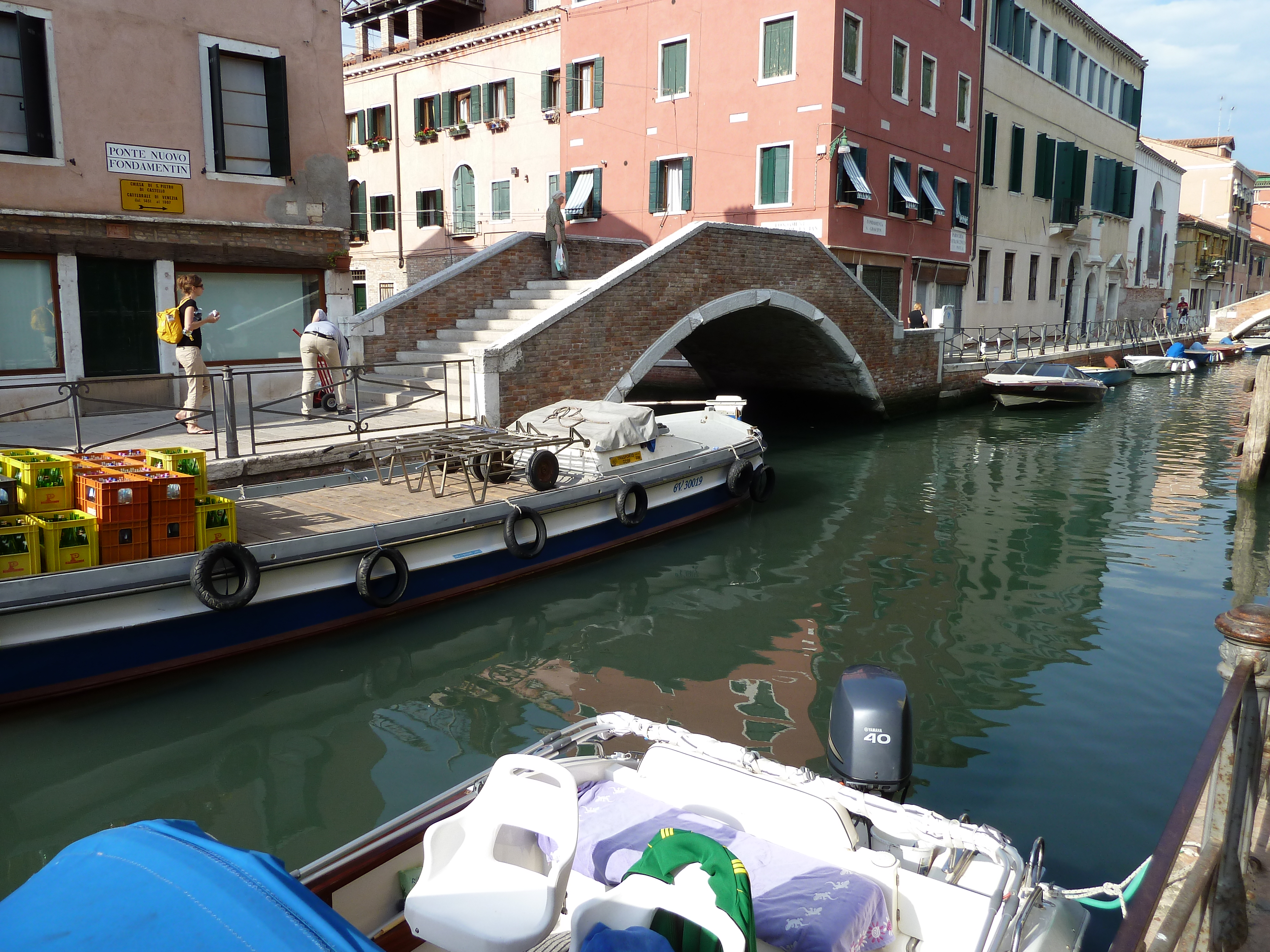
Ponte Novo
Rio de San Gerolamo
// Rio de Sant'Ana

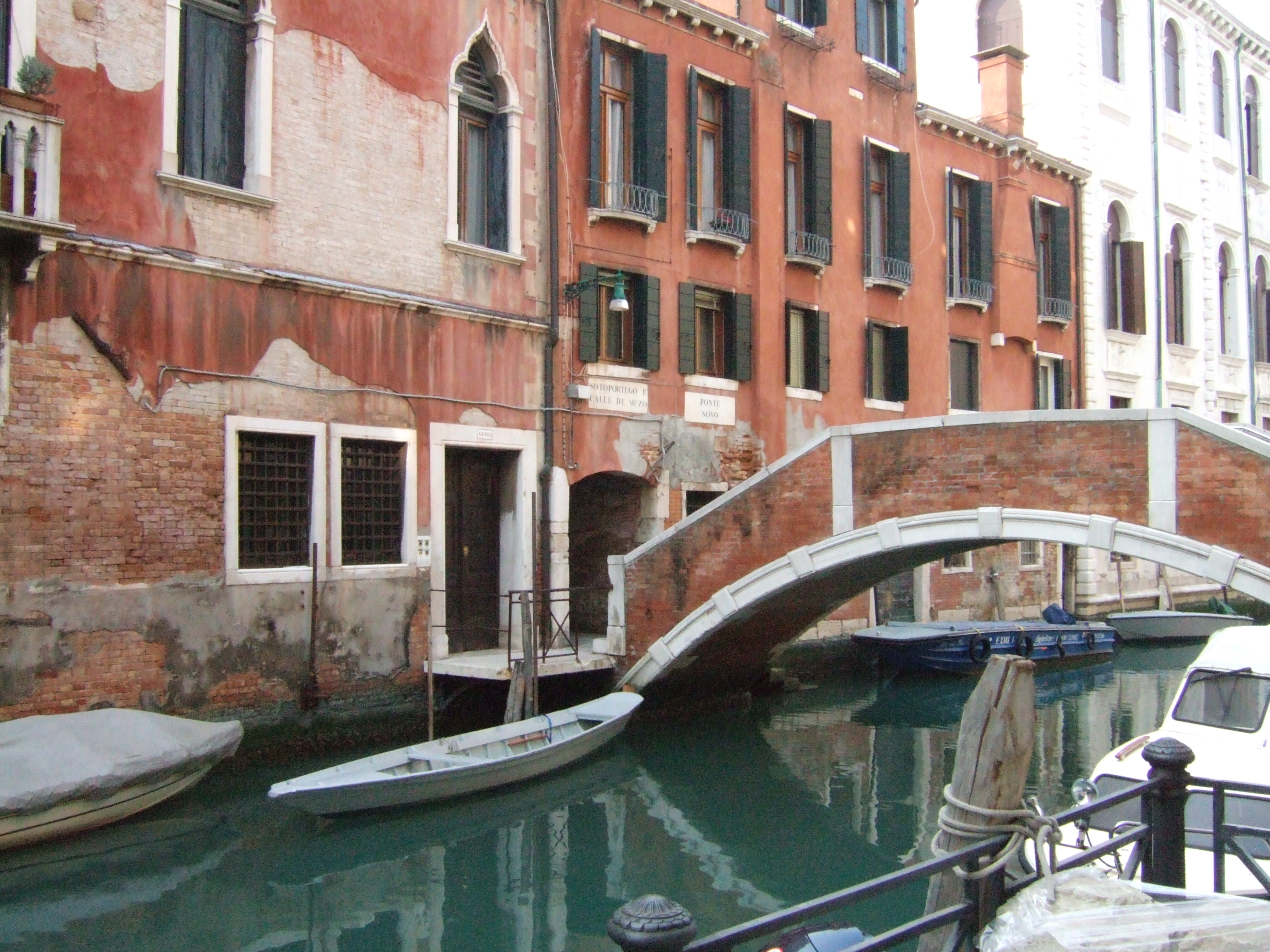
Ponte Novo ou de l'Arco
Rio de San Severo

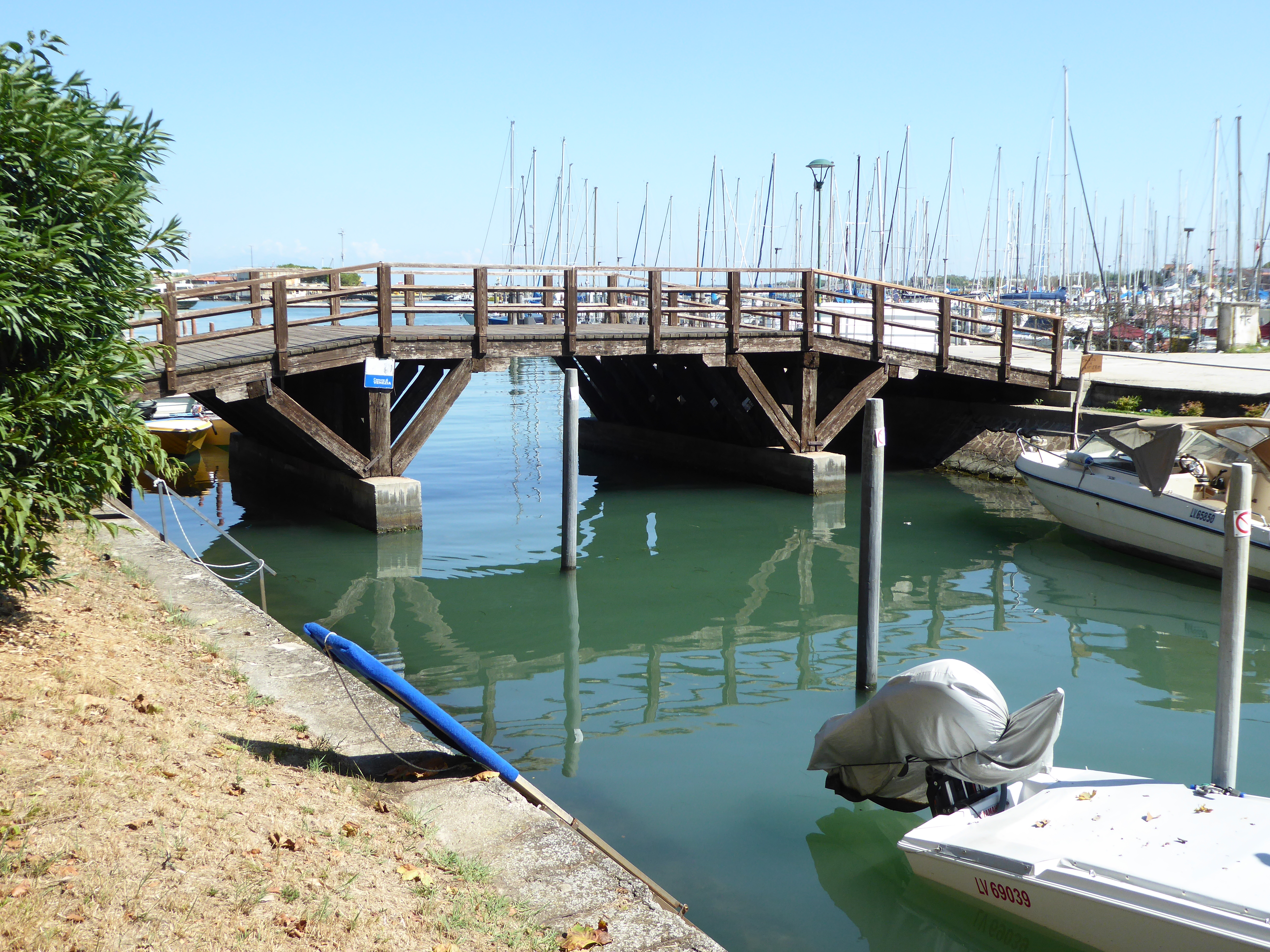
Ponte Novo del Pasuvio
Rio di Sant'Elena

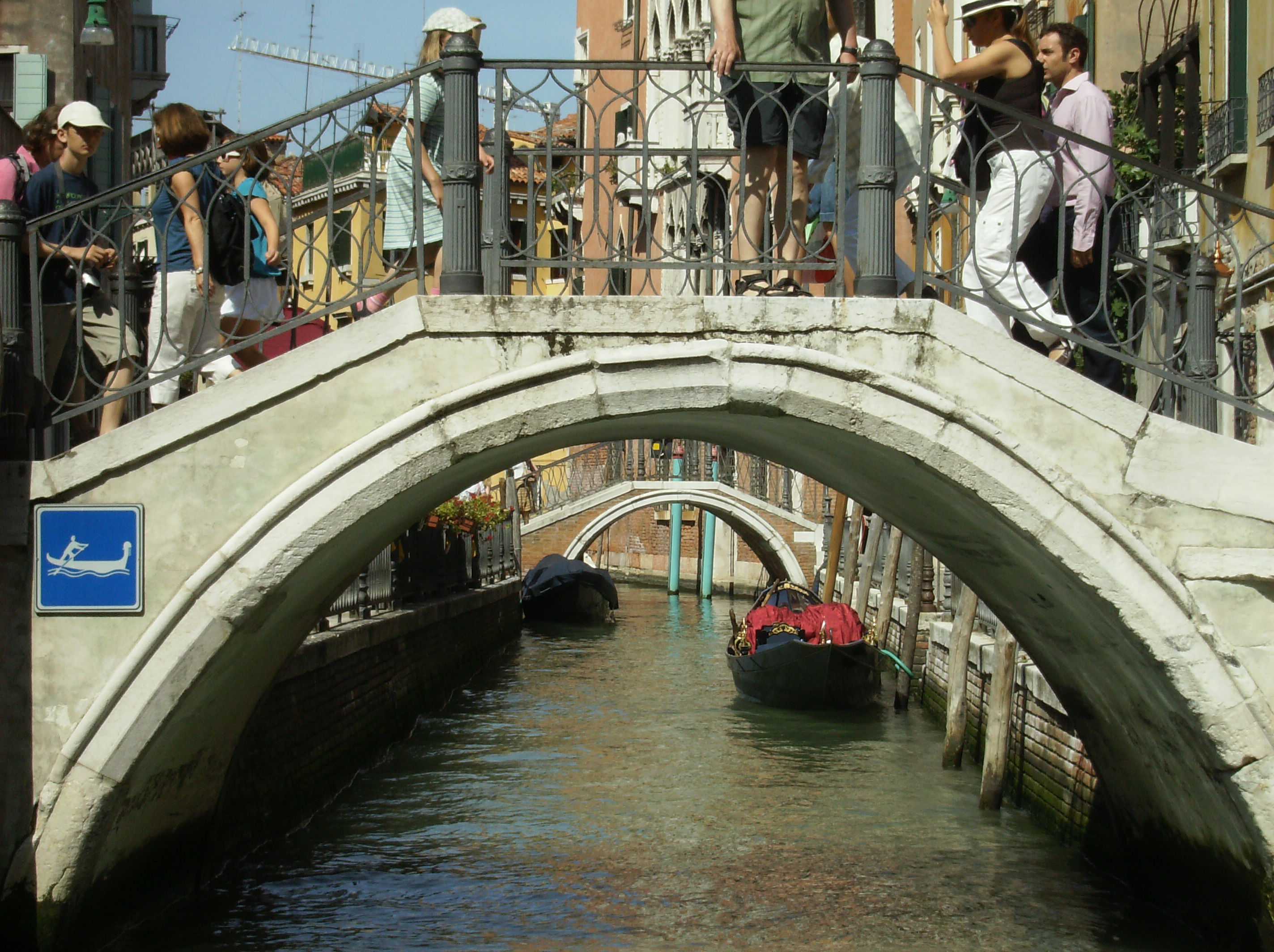
Ponte de l'Osmarin
Rio de San Provolo

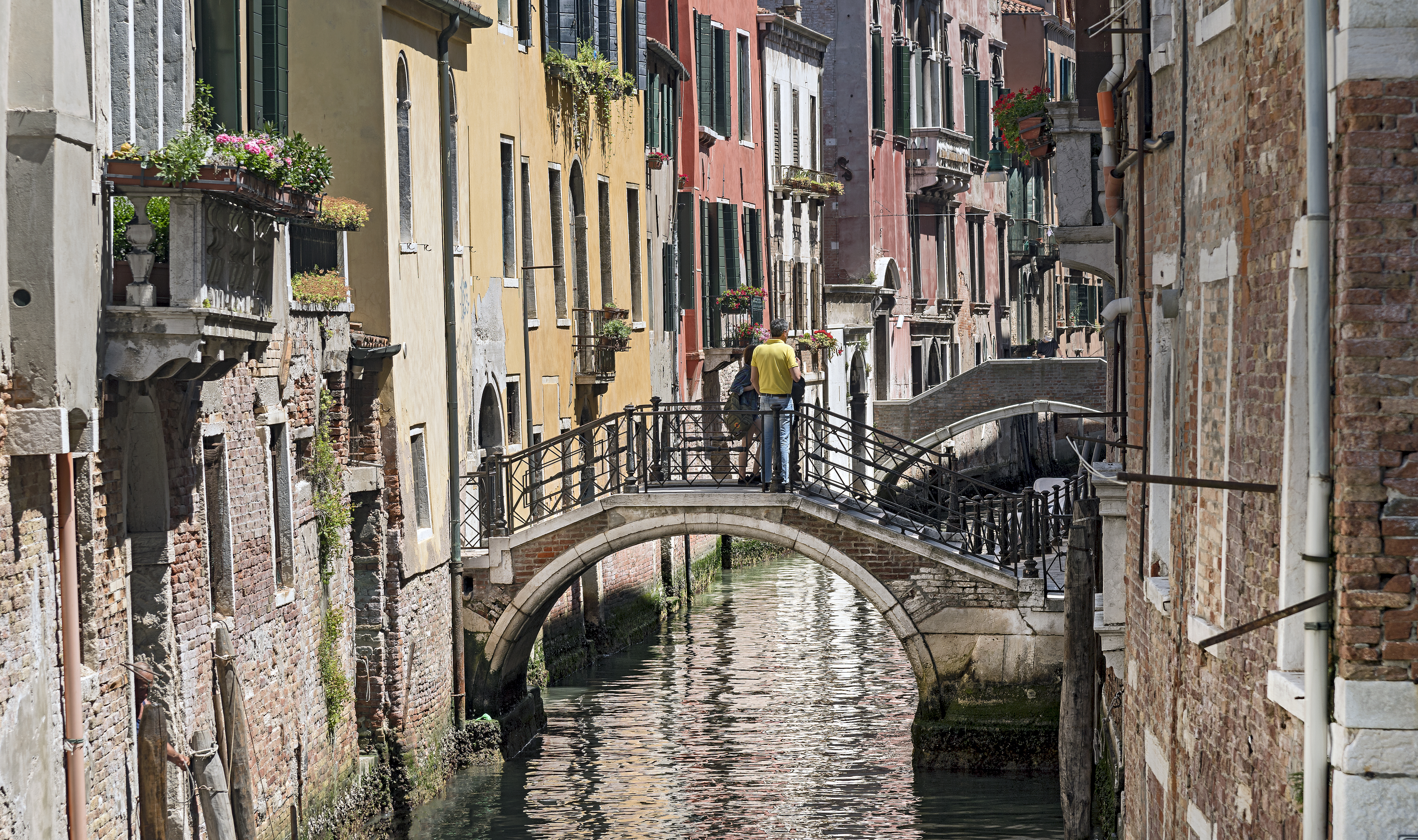
Ponte de l'Ospedaletto
Rio de San Giovanni Laterano

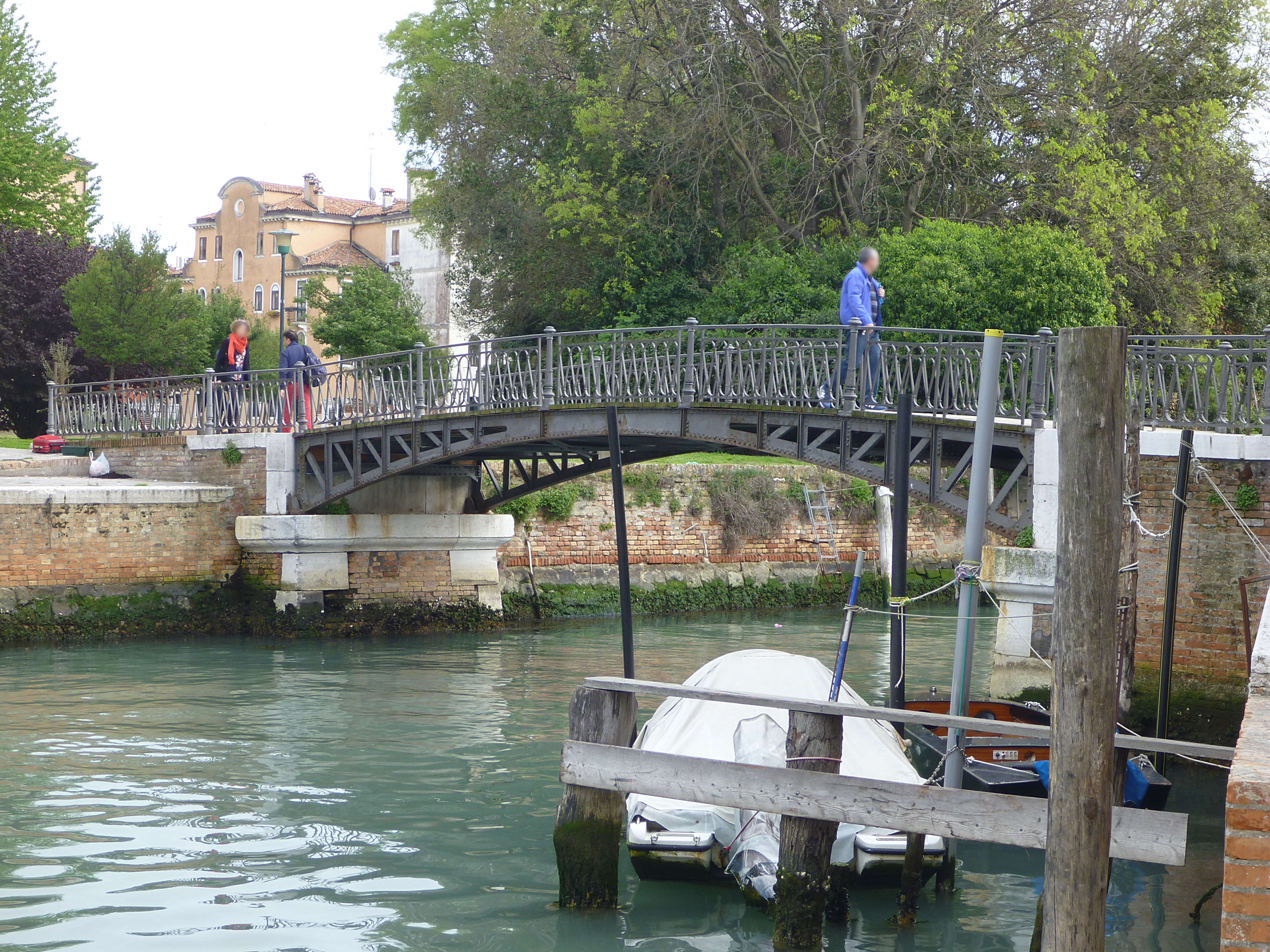
Ponte del Paludo
Rio dei Giardini

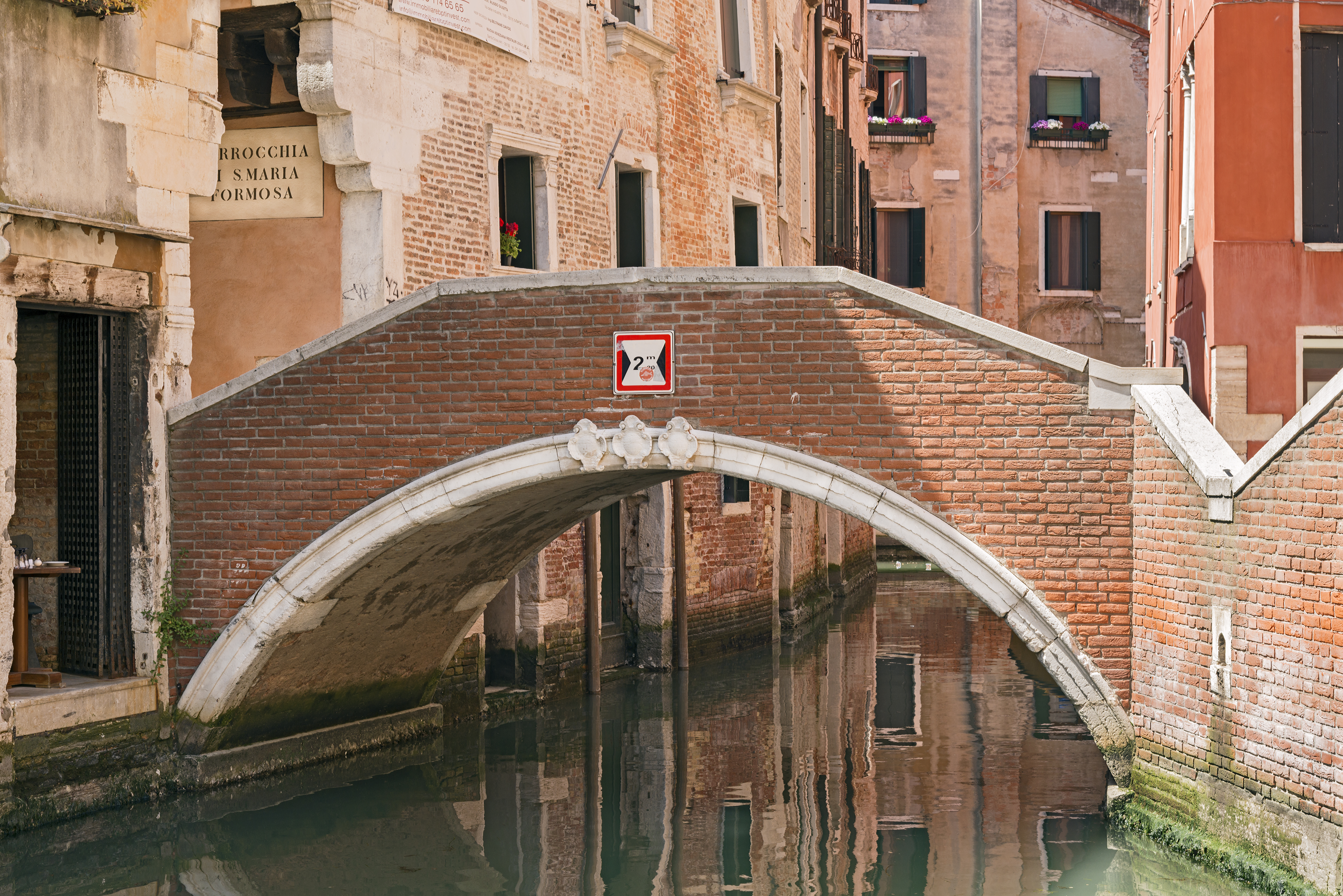
Ponte del Paradiso
Rio del Mondo Novo

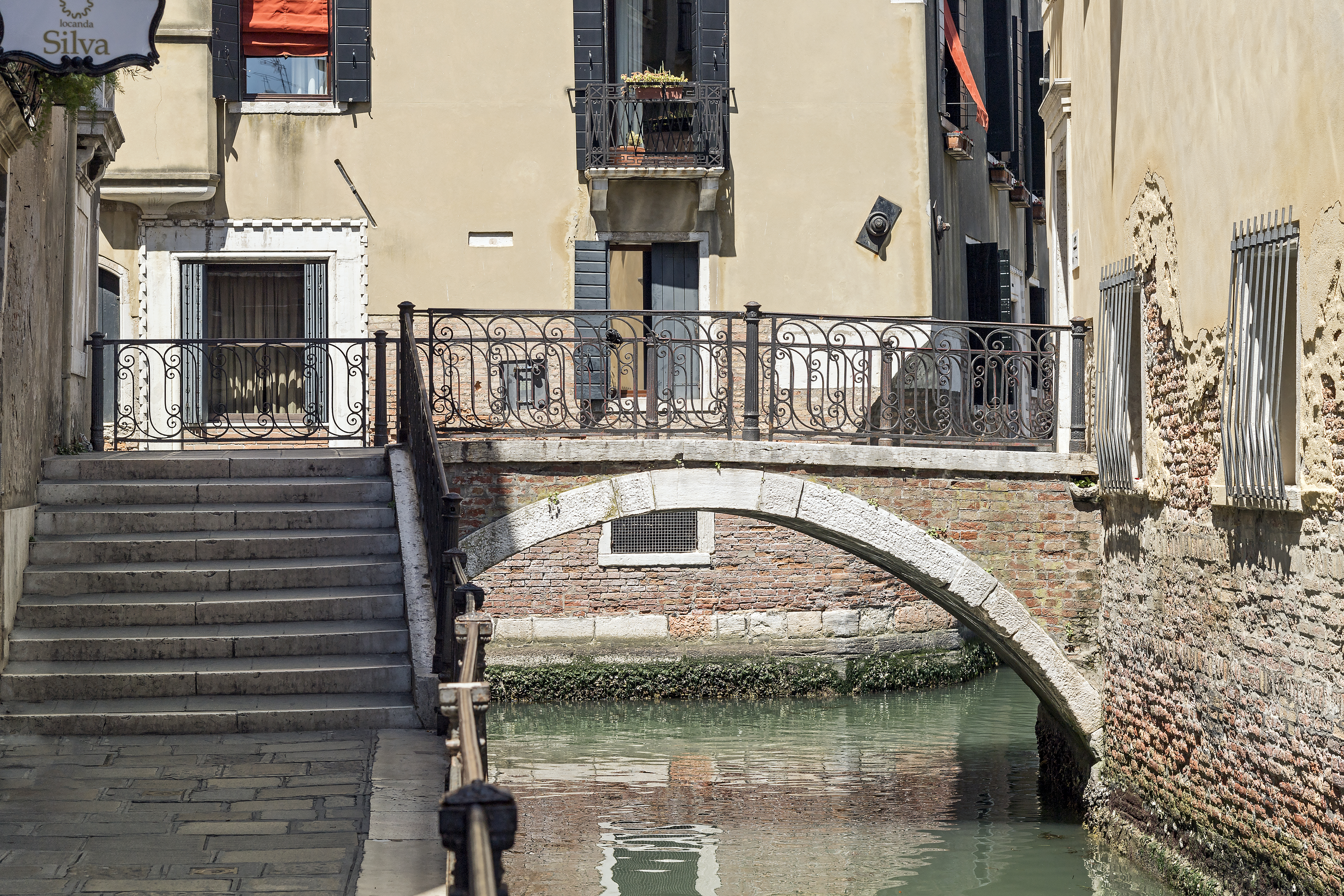
Ponte Pasqualigo
Rio de San Zaninovo
// au Rio del Mondo Novo

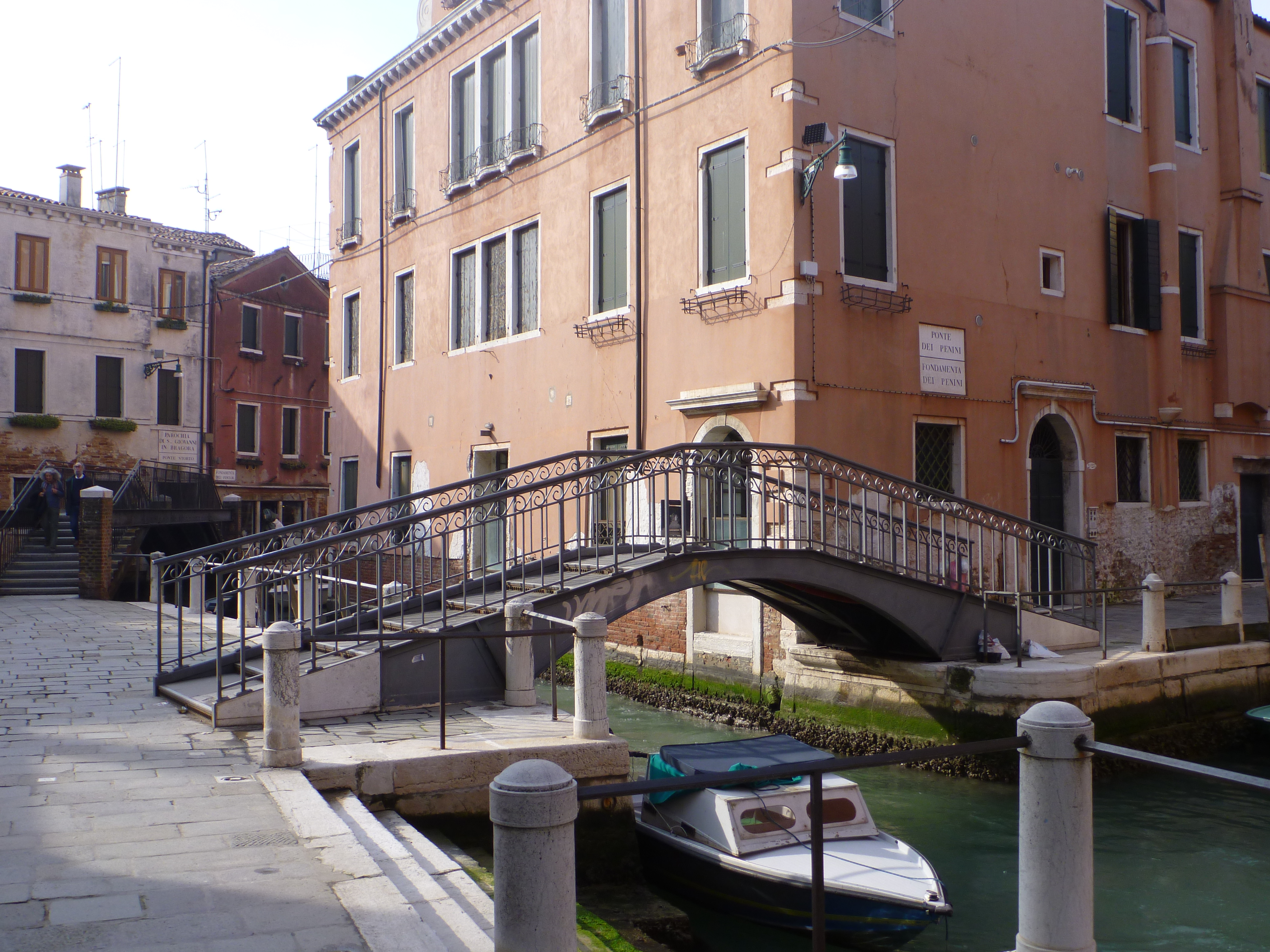
Ponte dei Penini
Rio de San Martin/dell' Arco

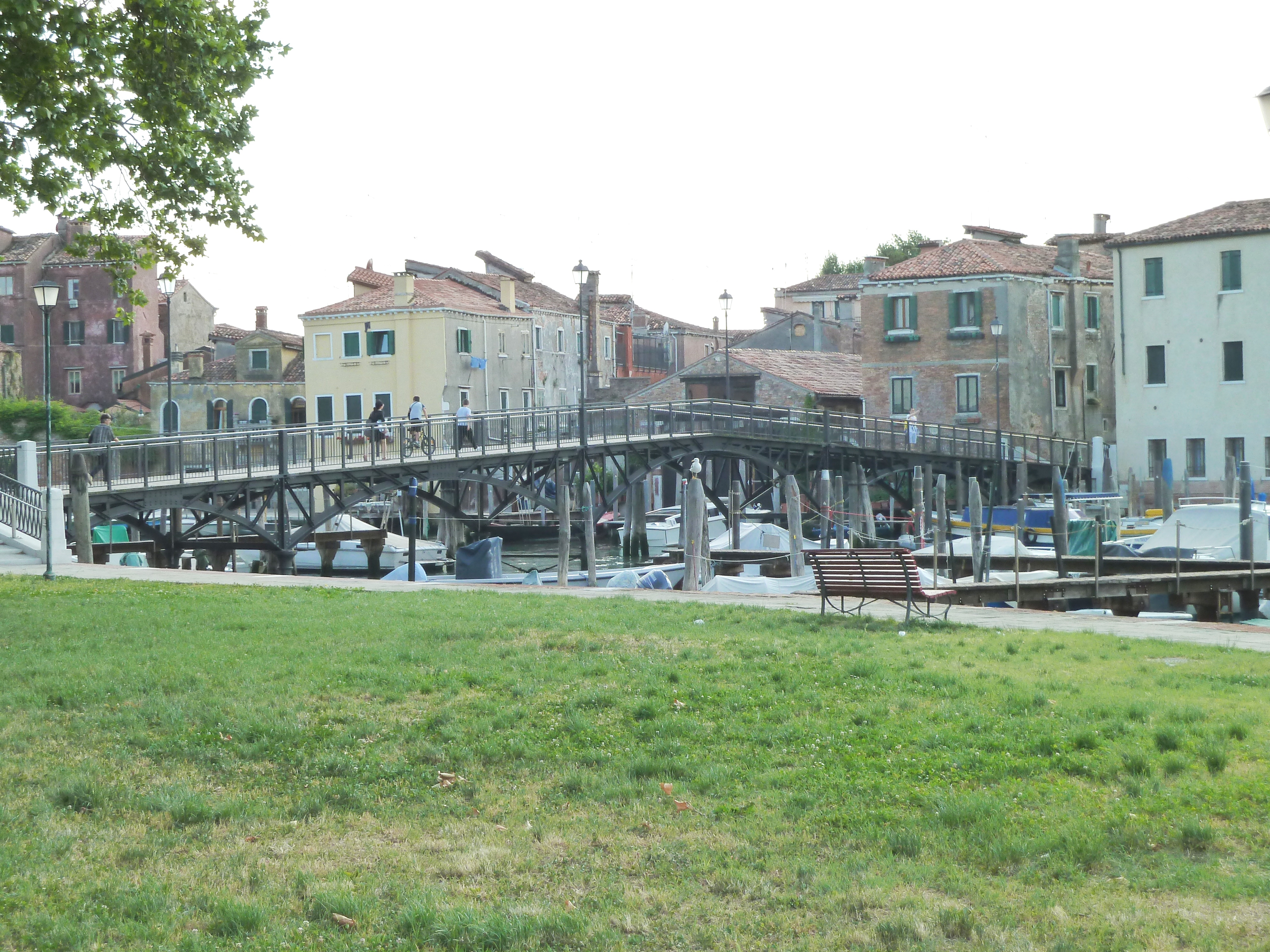
Ponte San Pietro
Canal de San Piero

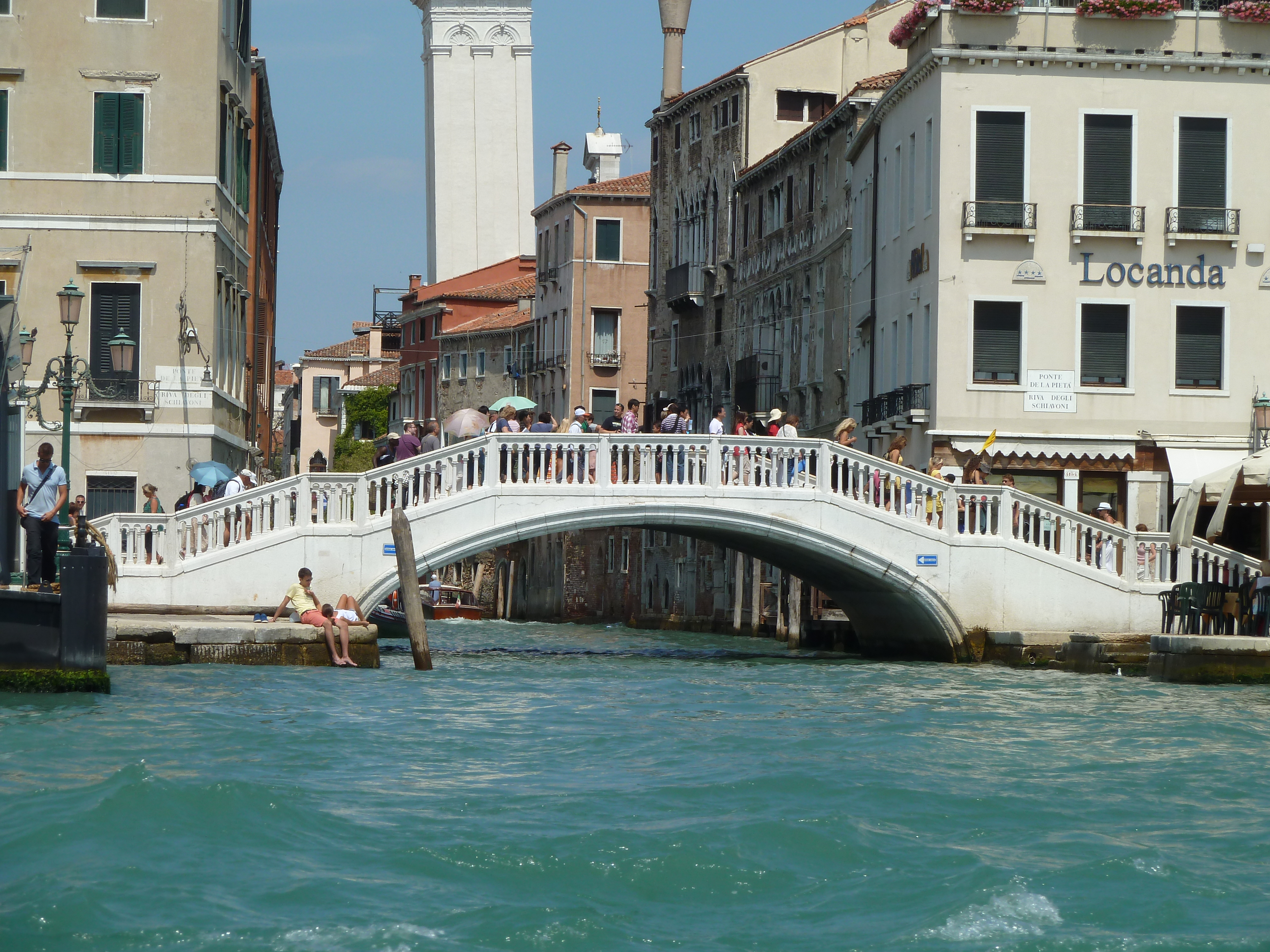
Ponte de la Pietà
Rio dei Greci

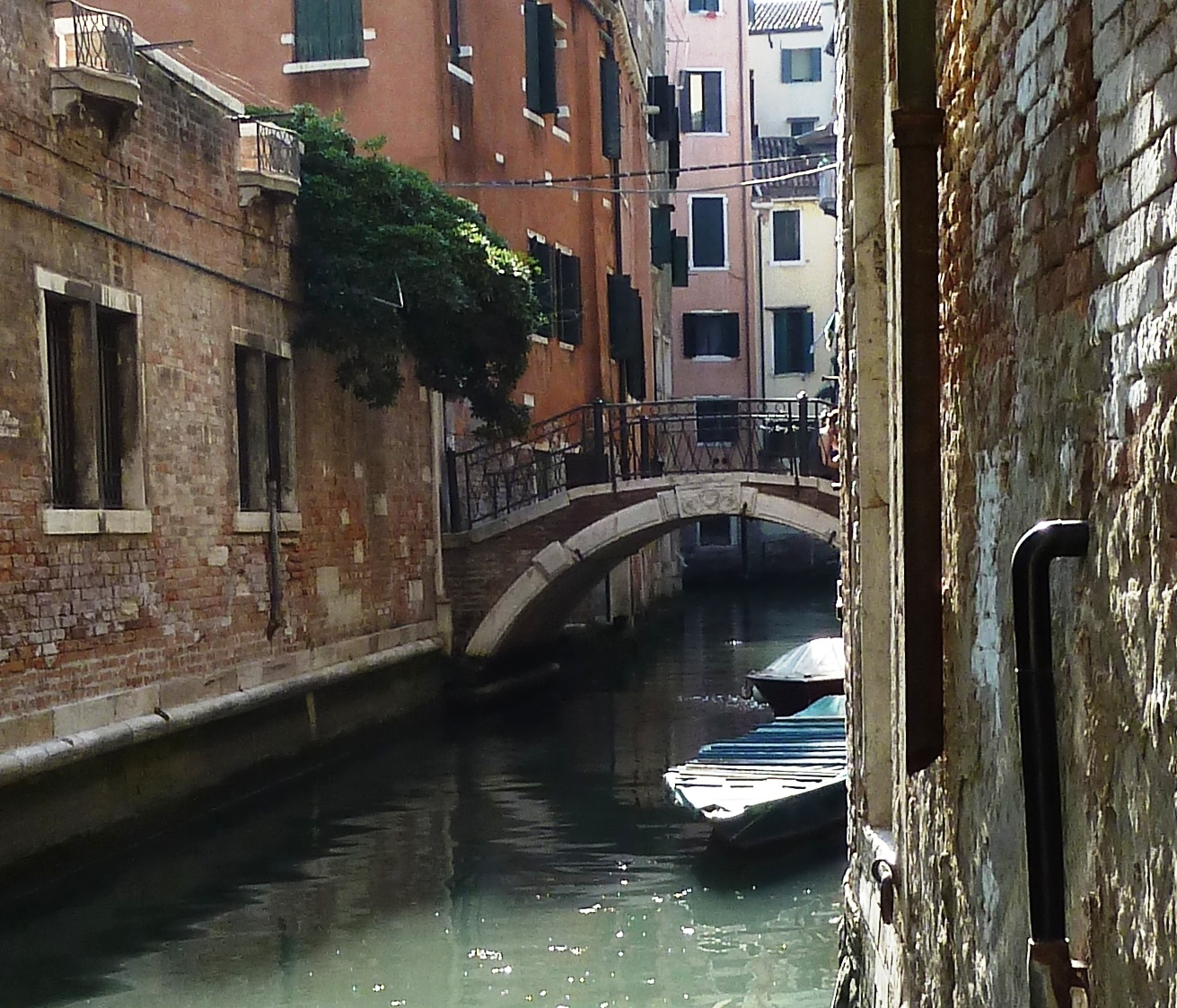
Ponte del Pistor
Rio del Piombo

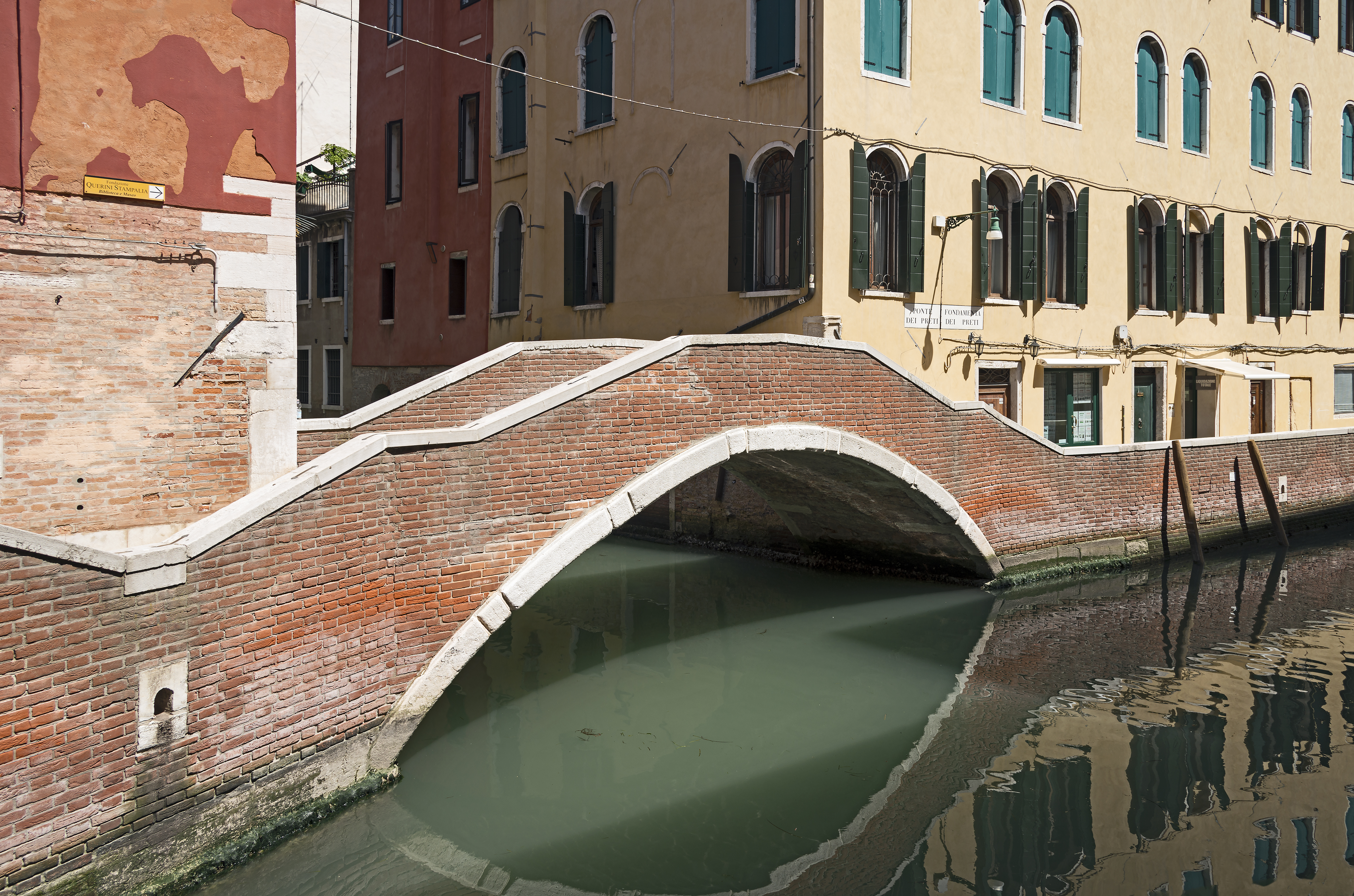
Ponte dei Preti
Rio del Paradiso

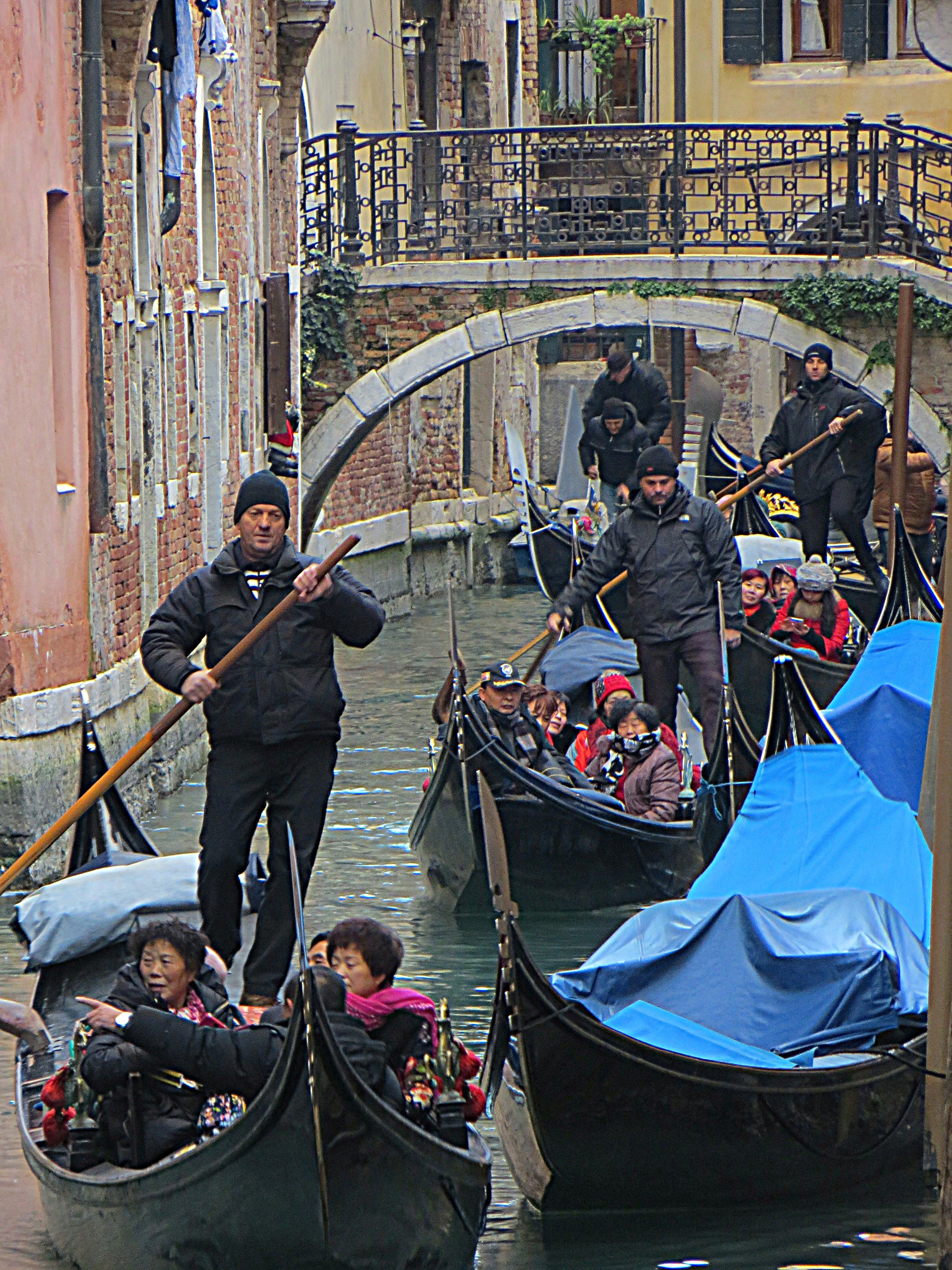
Ponte San Provolo
Rio del Vin

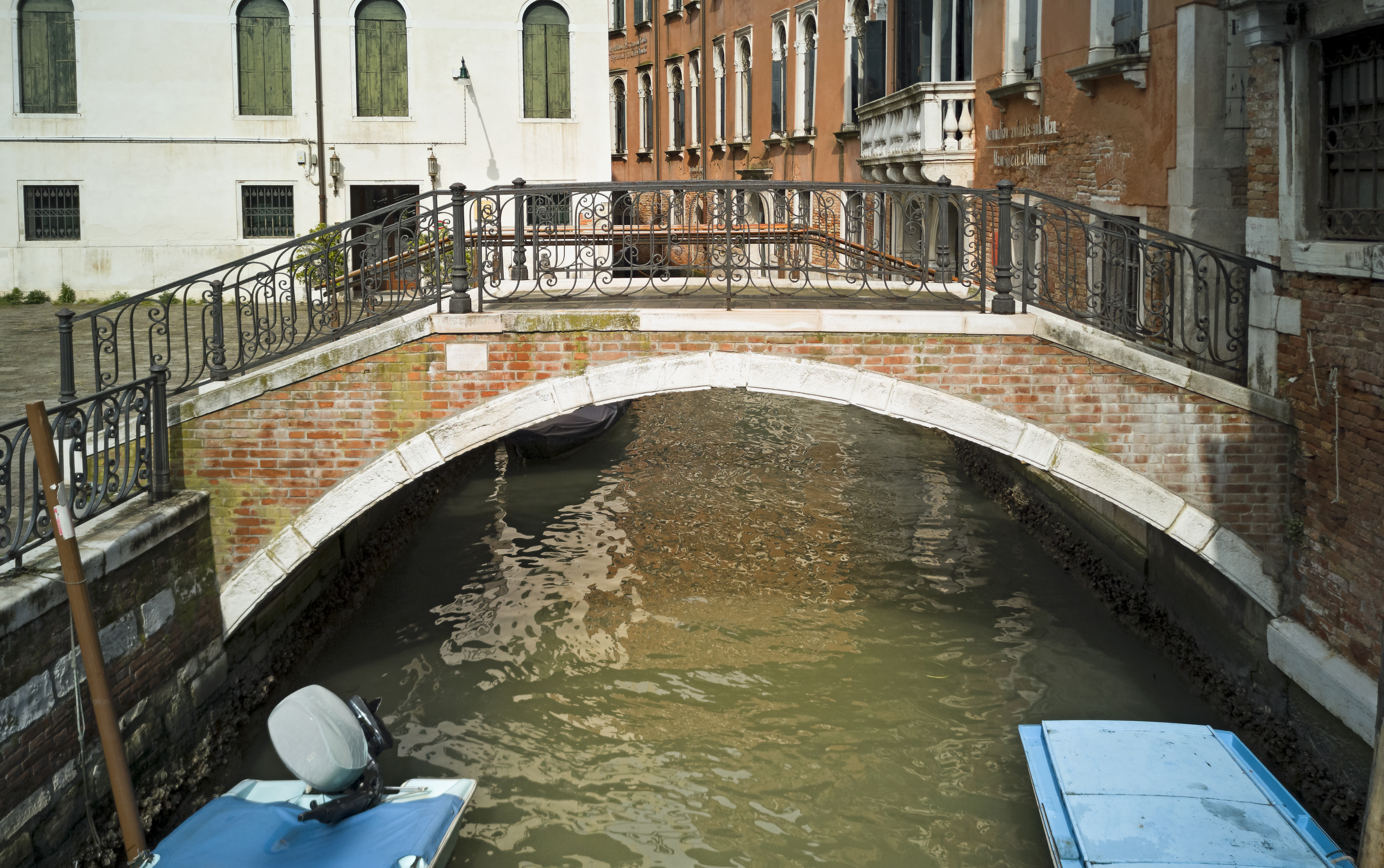
Ponte Querini
Rio de Santa Maria Formosa

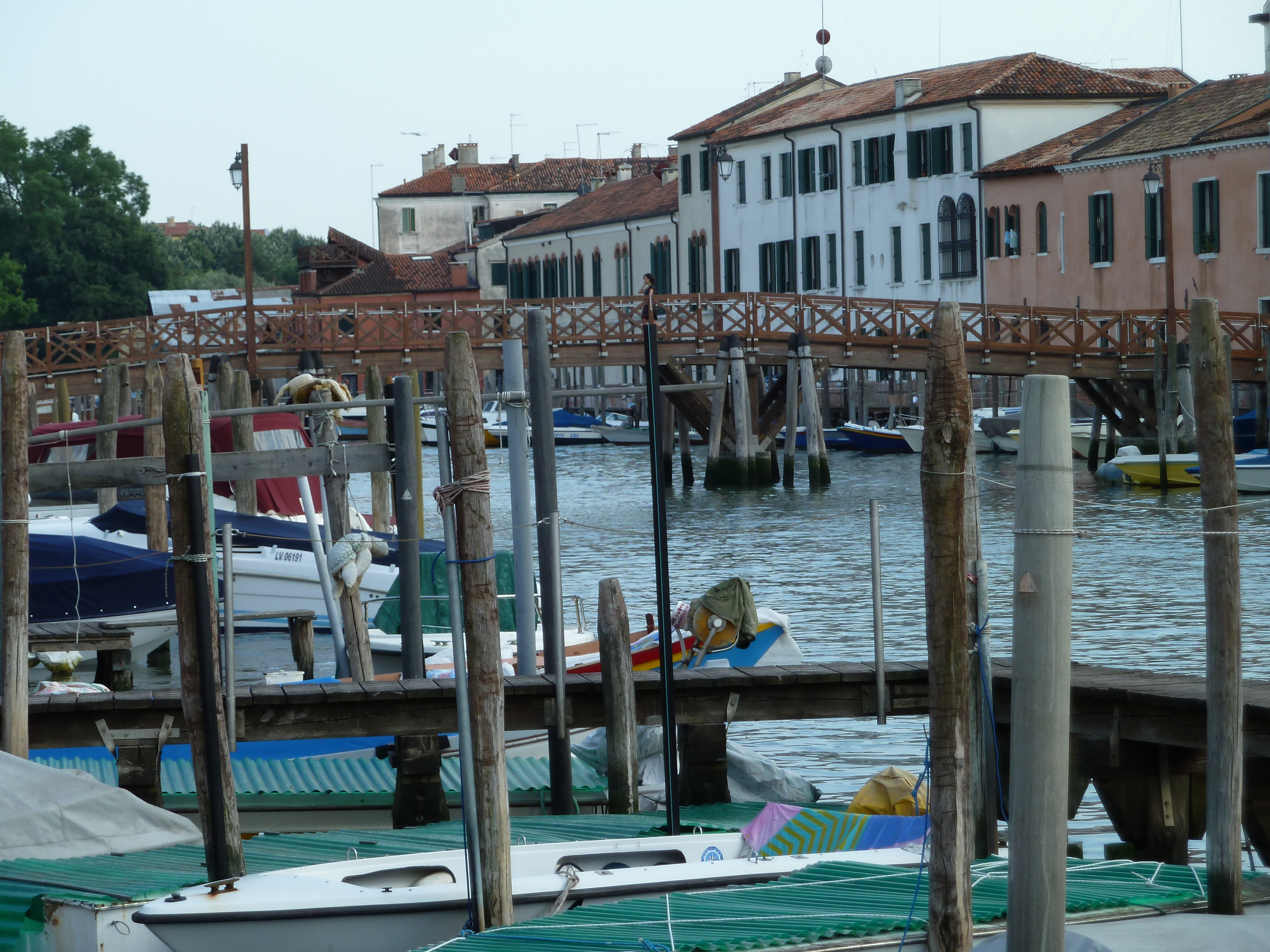
Ponte de Quintavale
Canal de San Piero

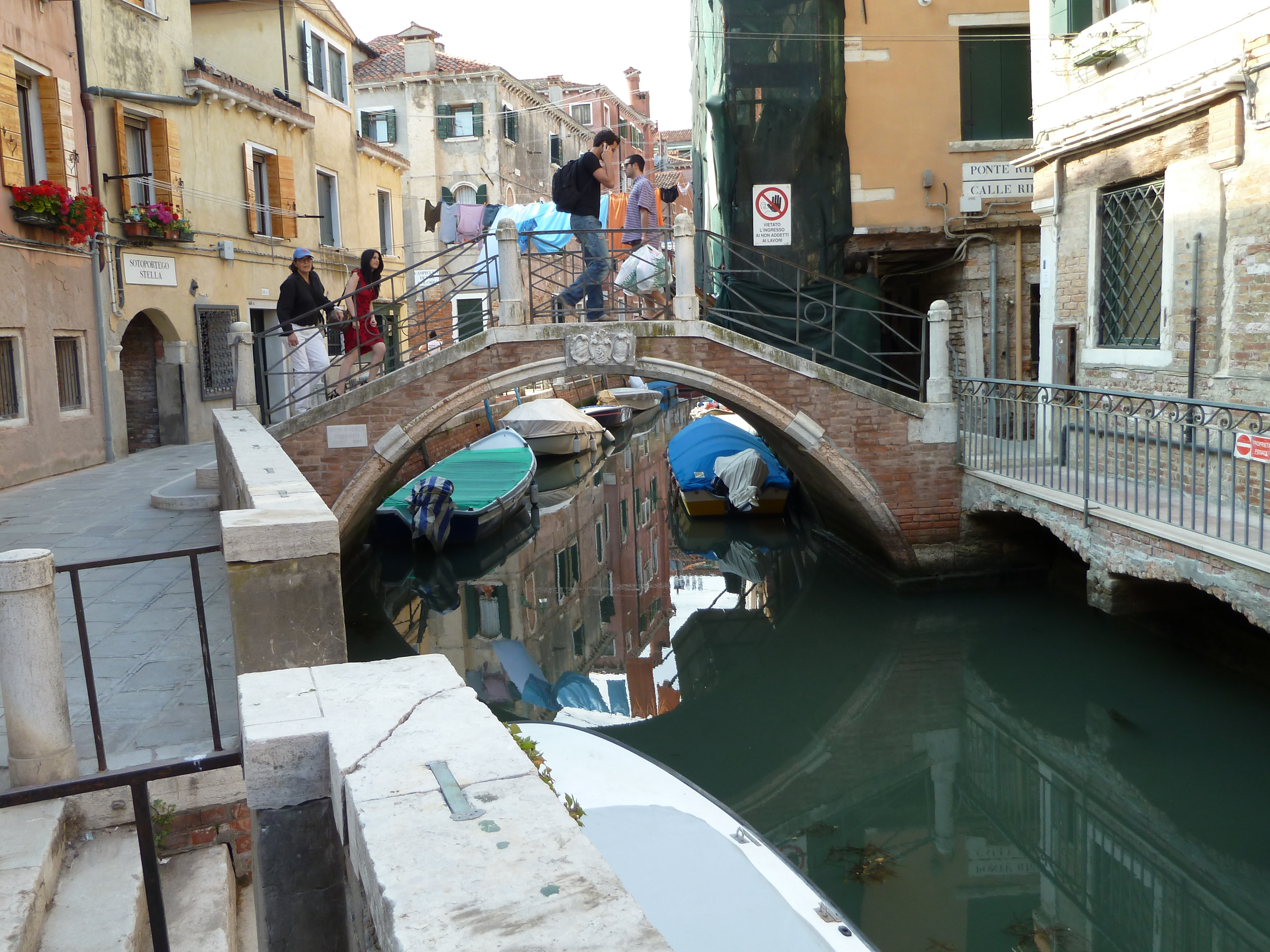
Ponte Riello
Rio de San Daniele - Riello

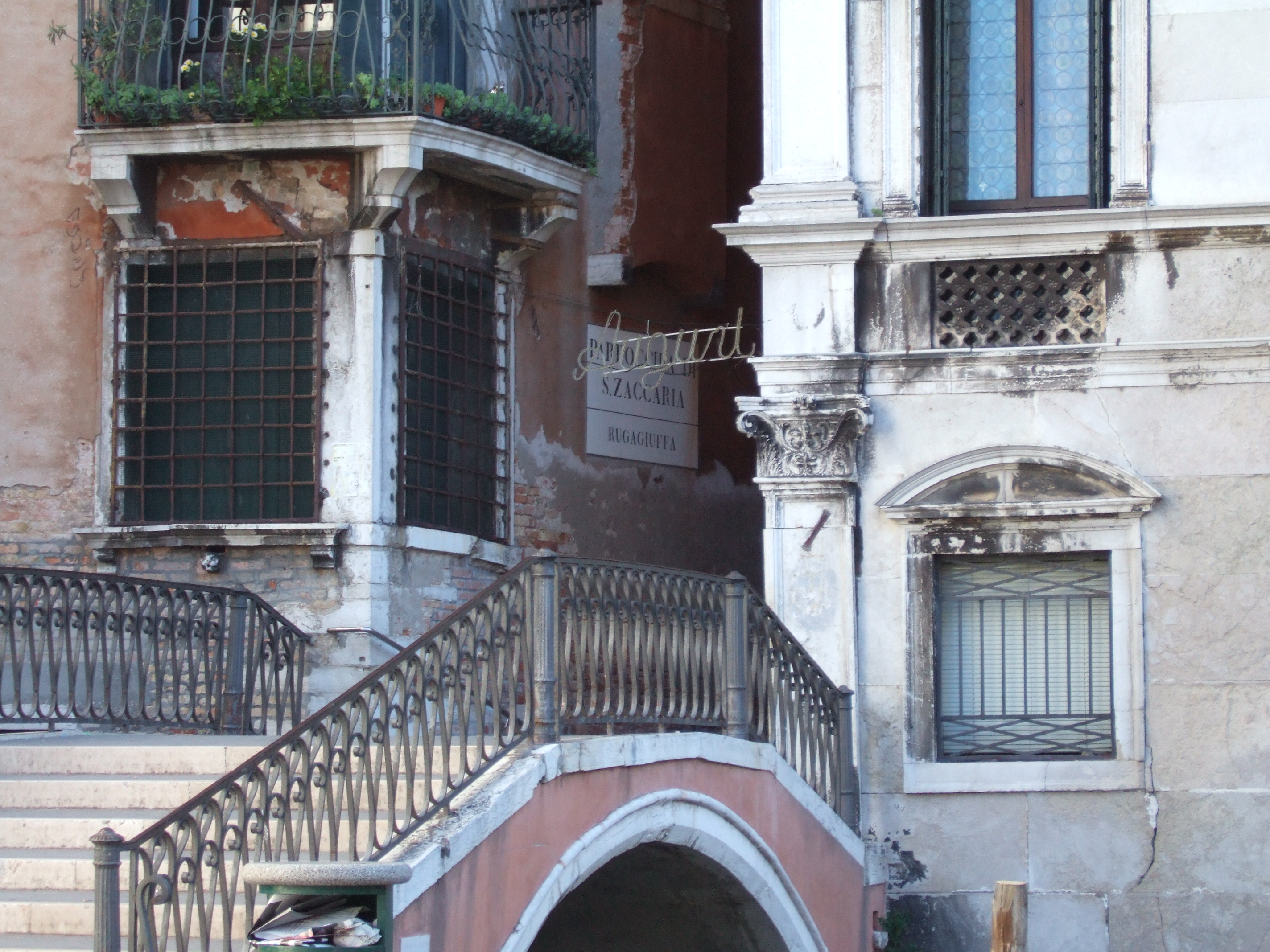
Ponte de Ruga Giuffa
Rio de Santa Maria Formosa

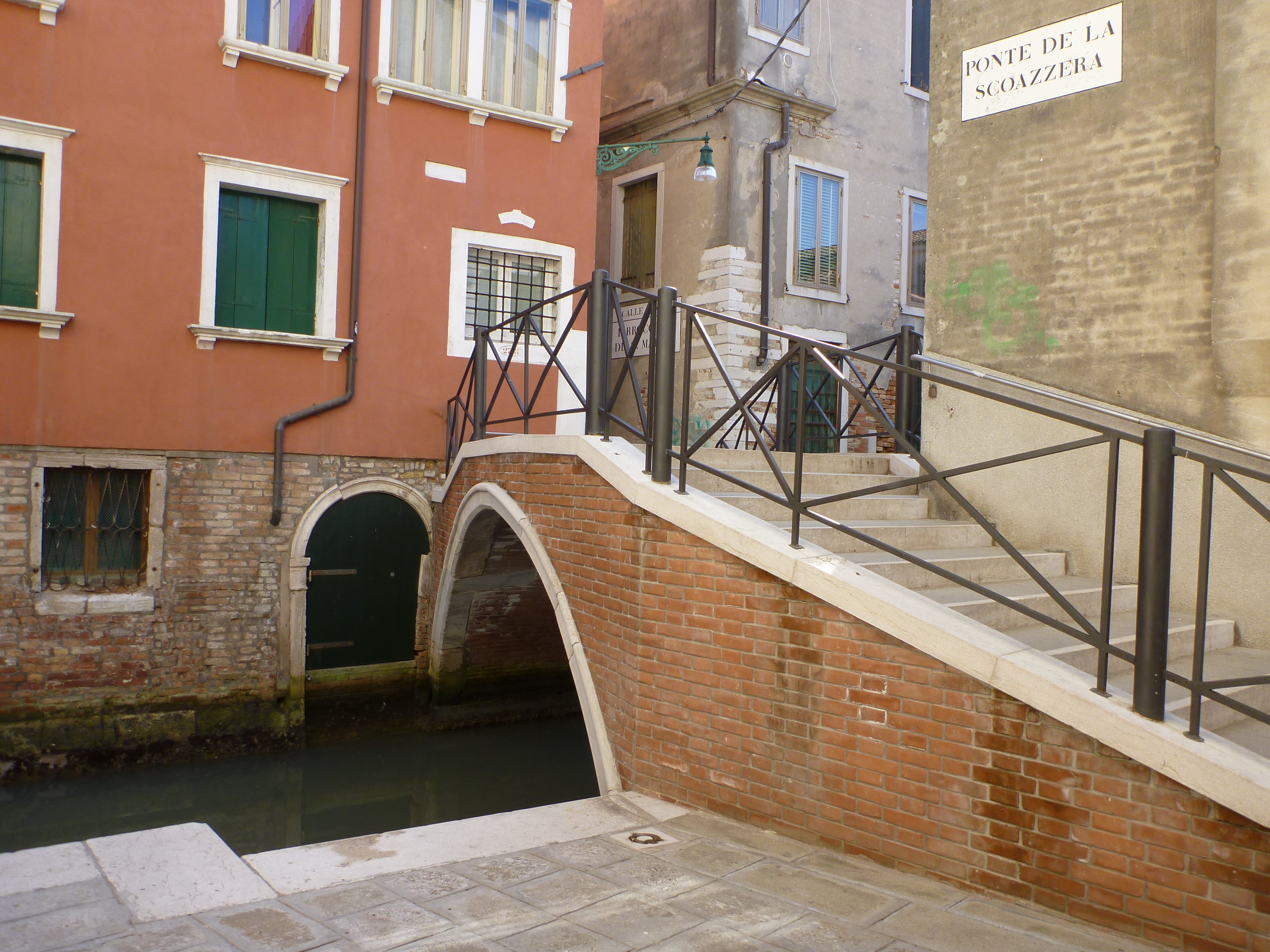
Ponte de la Scoazera
Rio dei Scudi e de la Santa Ternita

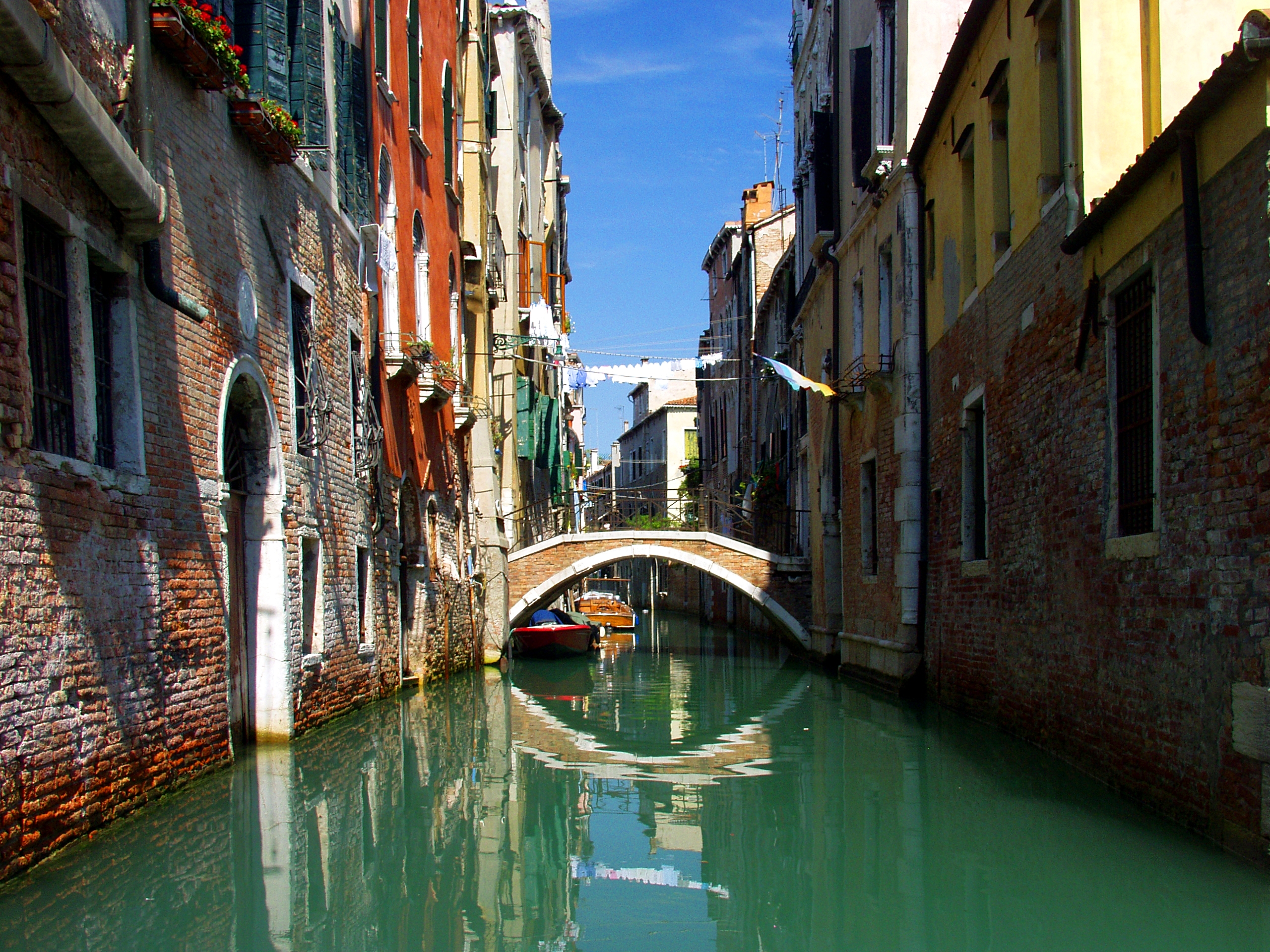
Ponte dei Scudi
Rio dei Scudi e de la Santa Ternita

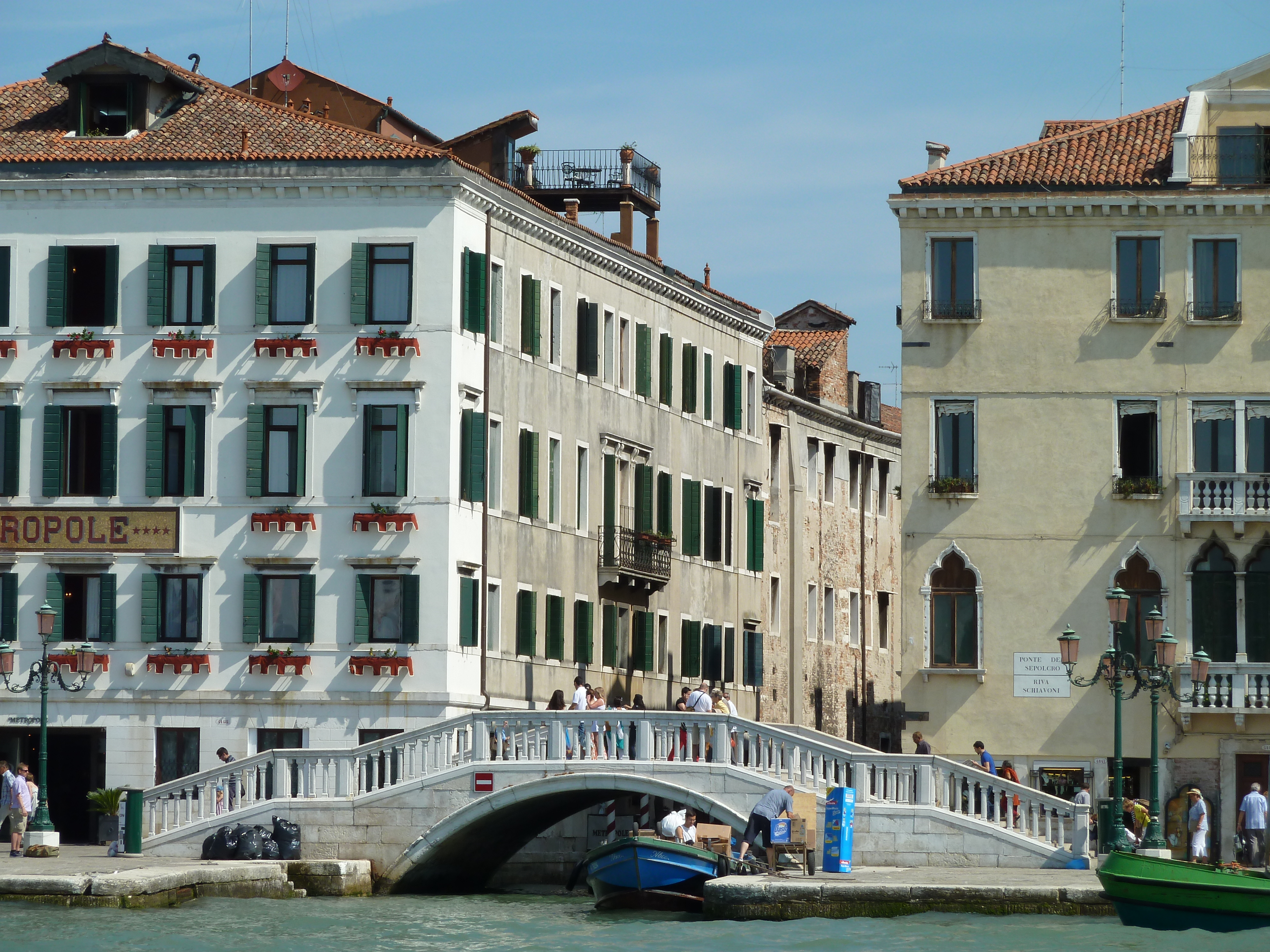
Ponte del Sepolcro
Rio della Pietà

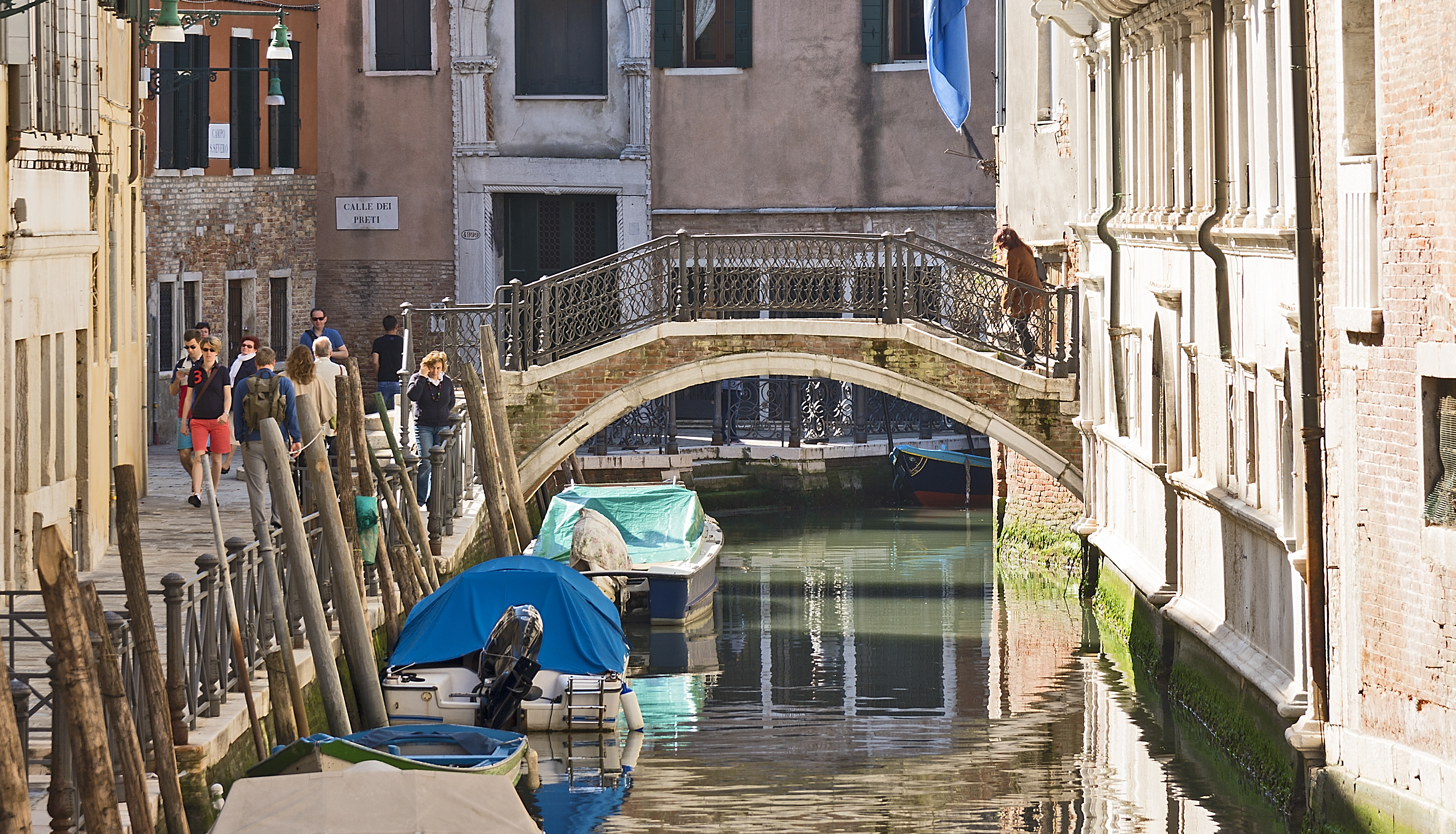
Ponte San Severo
Rio de San Severo

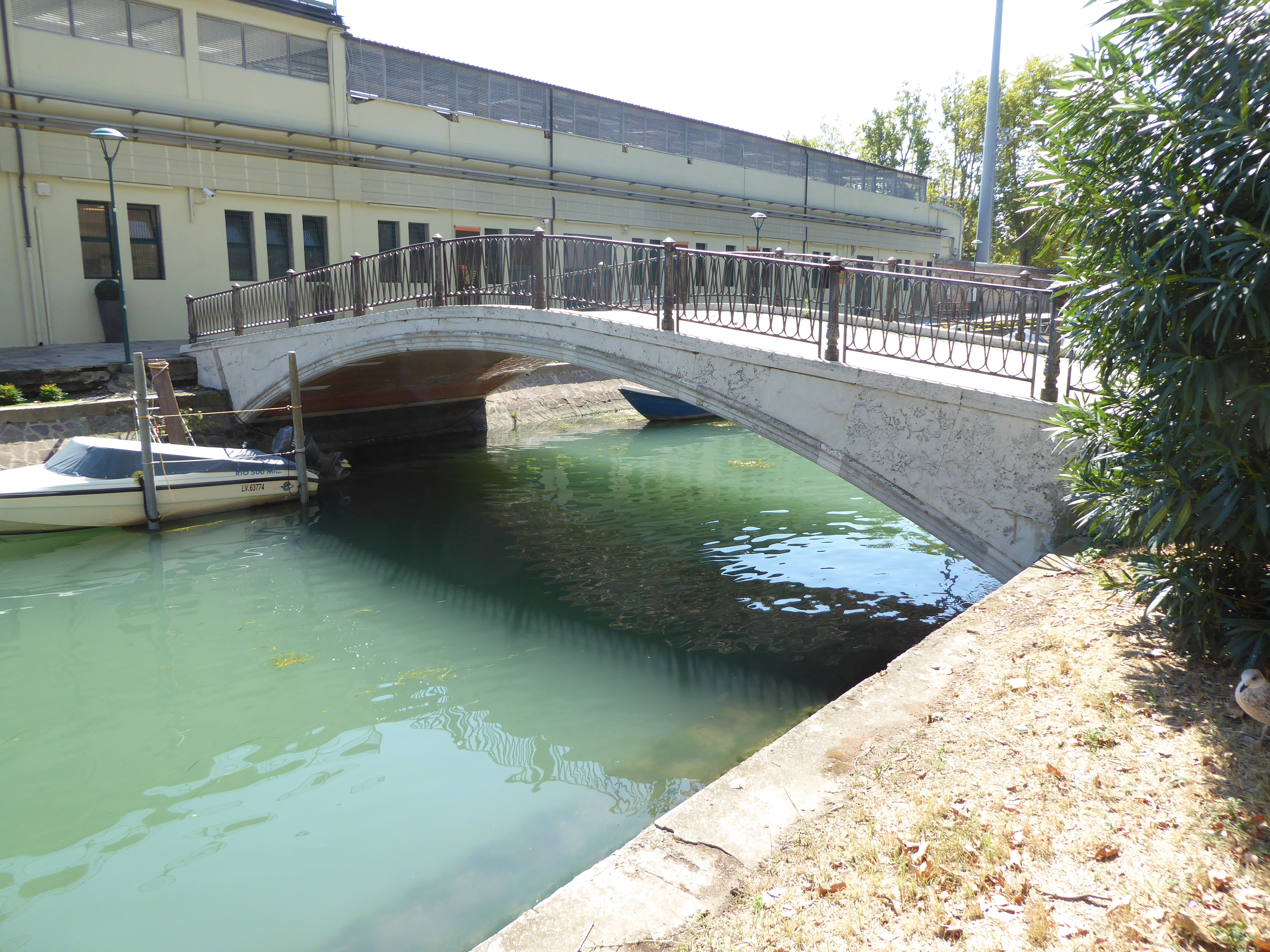
Ponte del Stadio
Rio di Sant'Elena

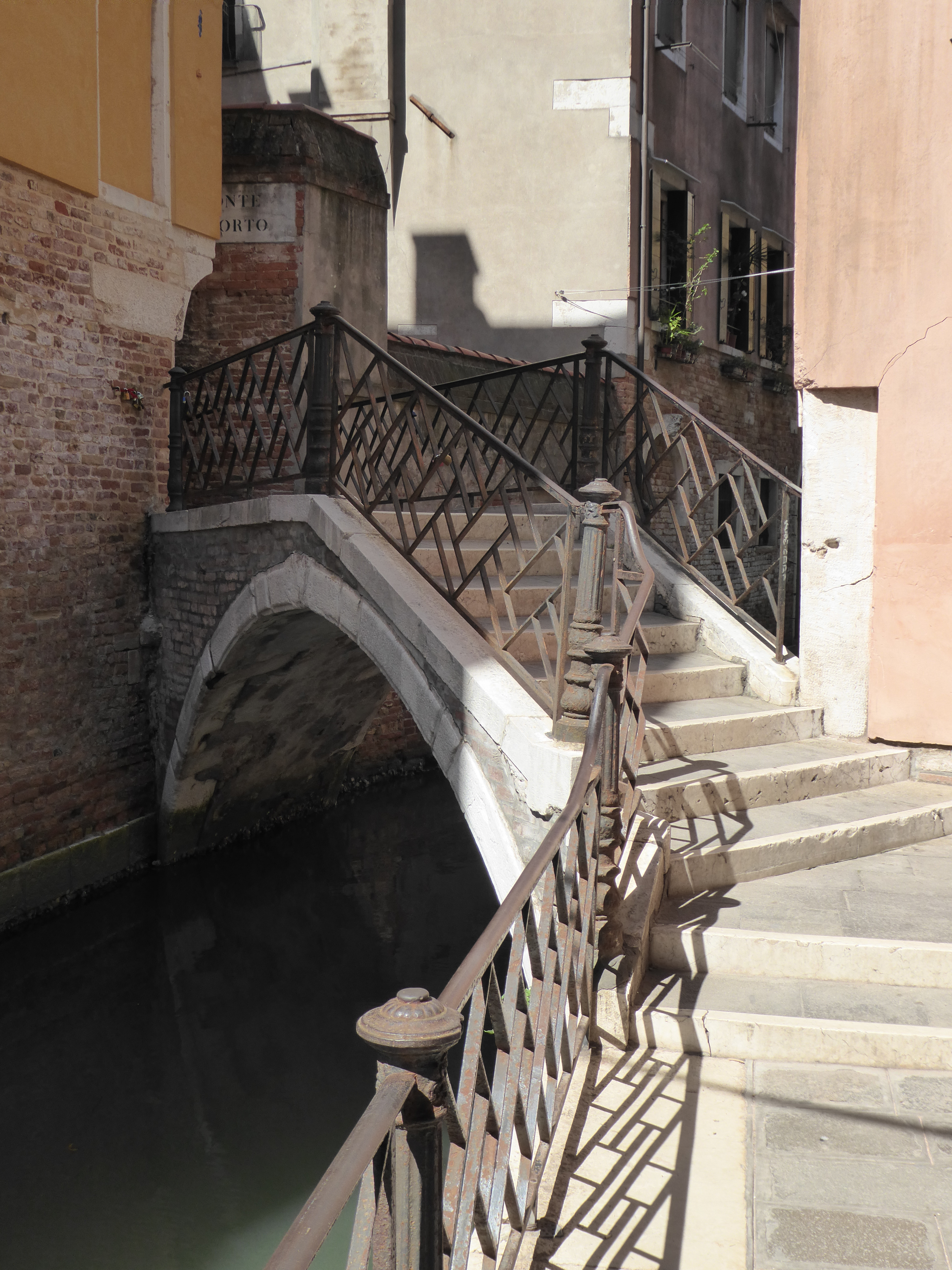
Ponte Storto
Rio del Remedio

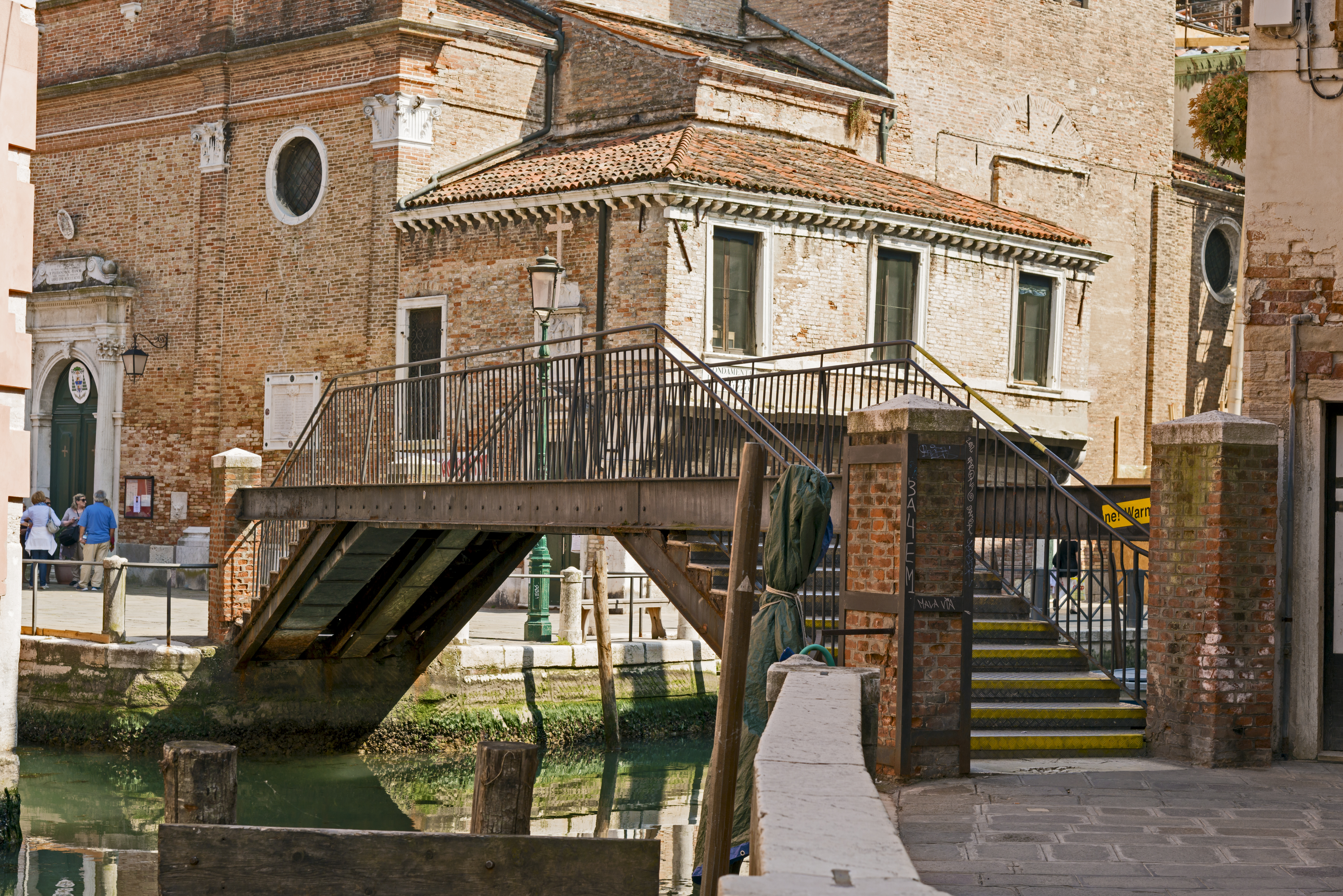
Ponte Storto (San Martino)
Rio de San Martin / Arco

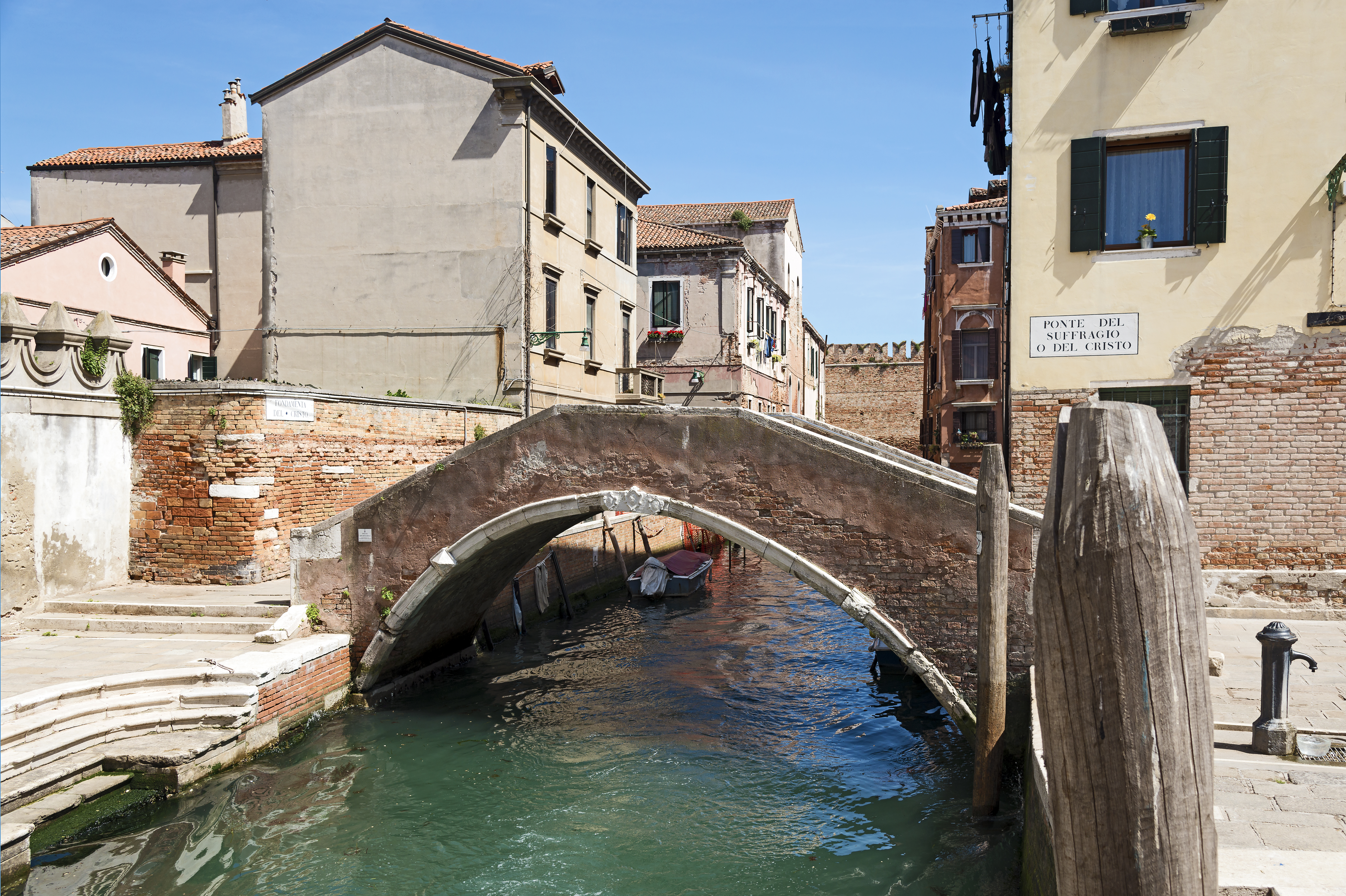
Ponte del Suffragio ou del Cristo
Rio de San Francesco de la Vigna

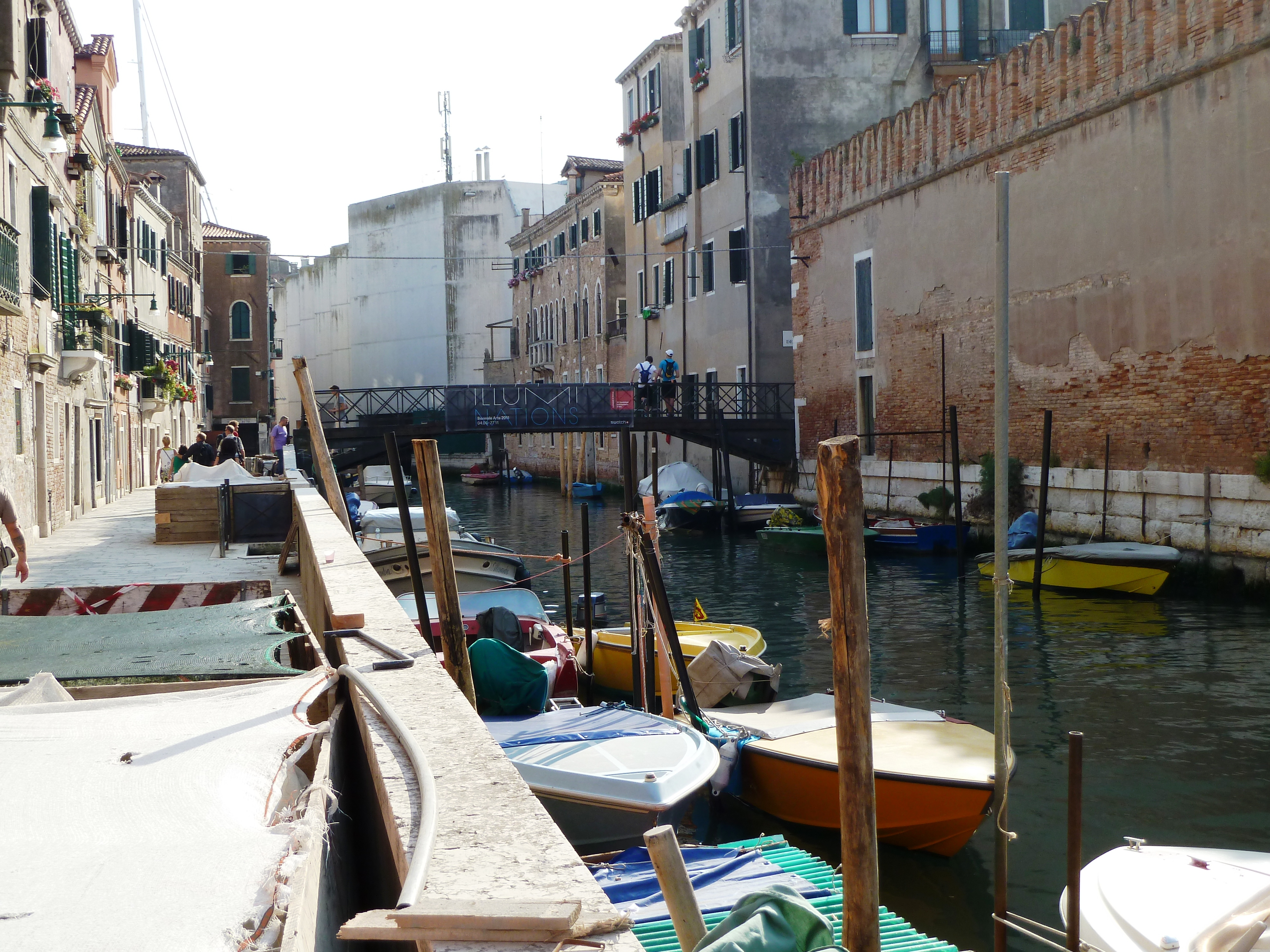
Ponte de la Tana
Rio de la Tana

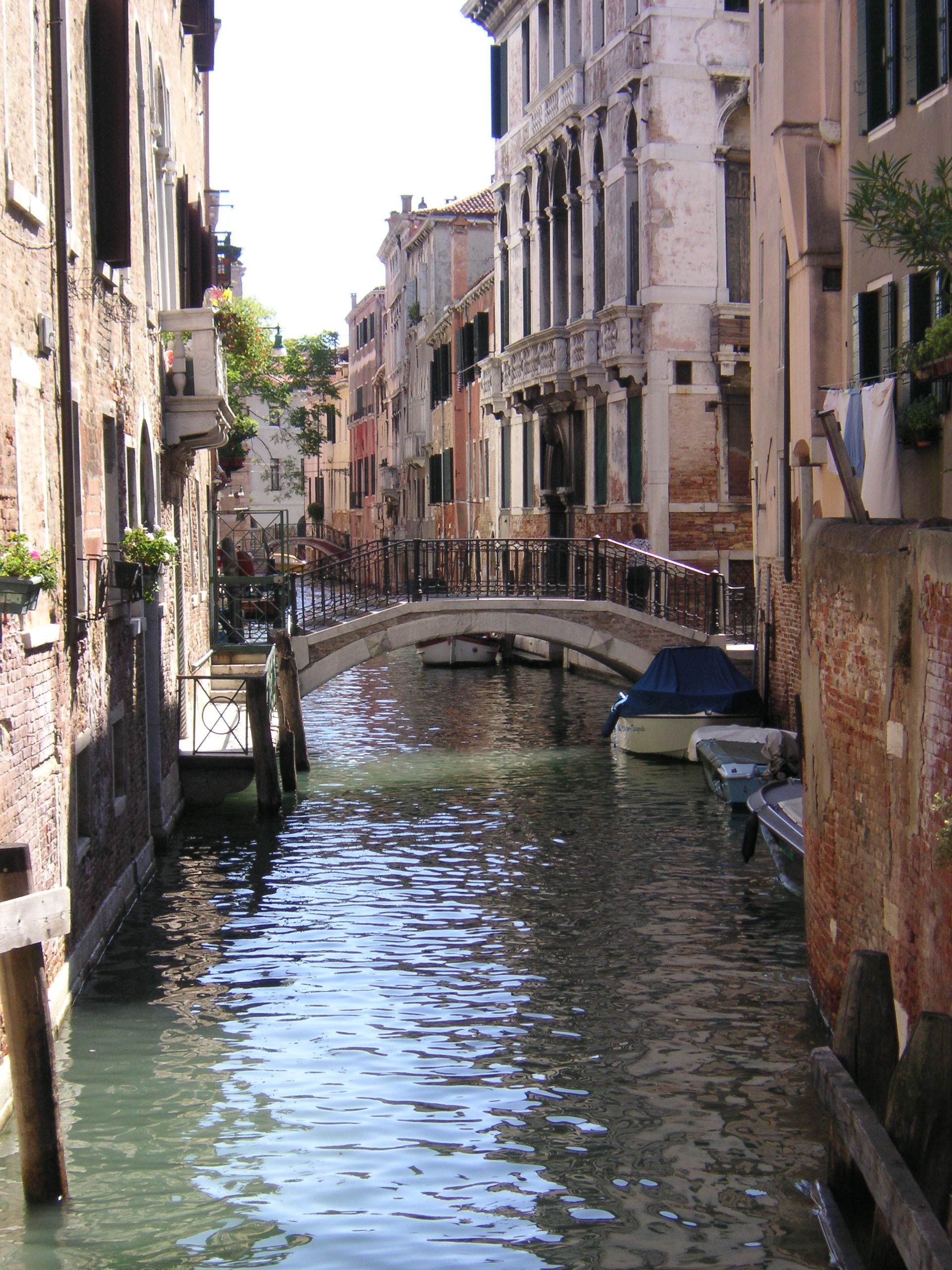
Ponte Tetta
Rio Tetta

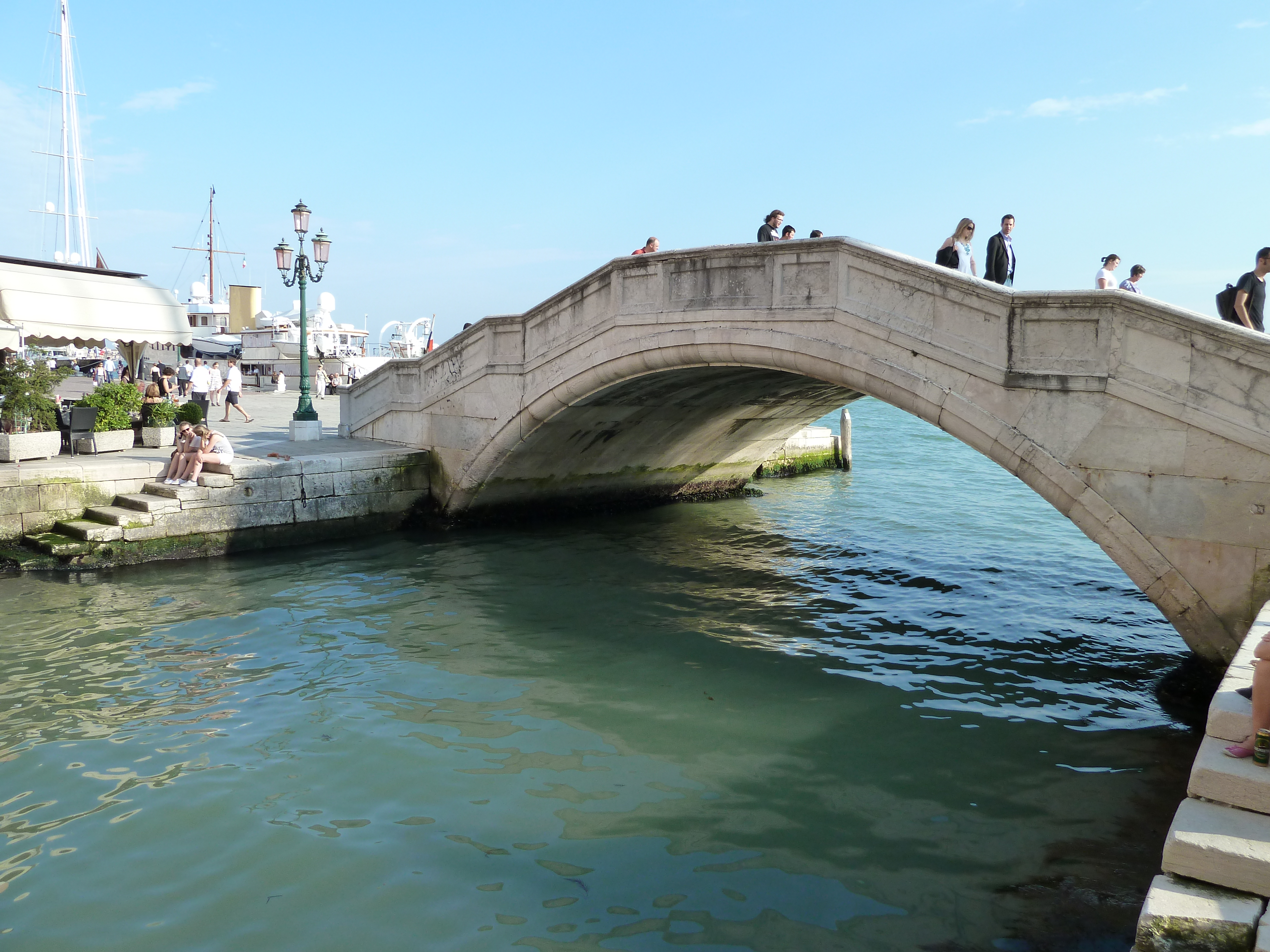
Ponte de la Veneta Marina/Cadene
Rio de la Tana

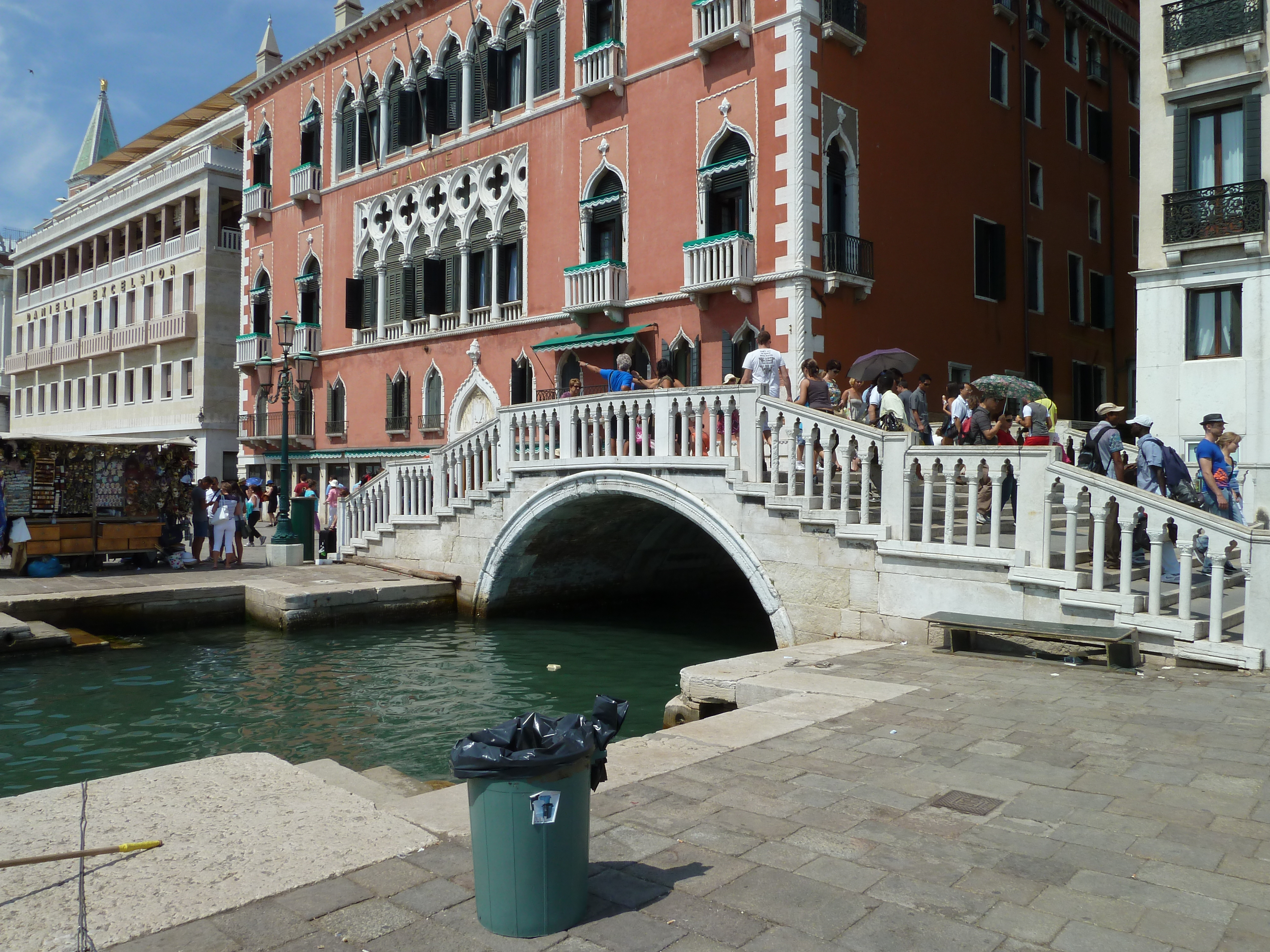
Ponte del Vin
Rio del Vin
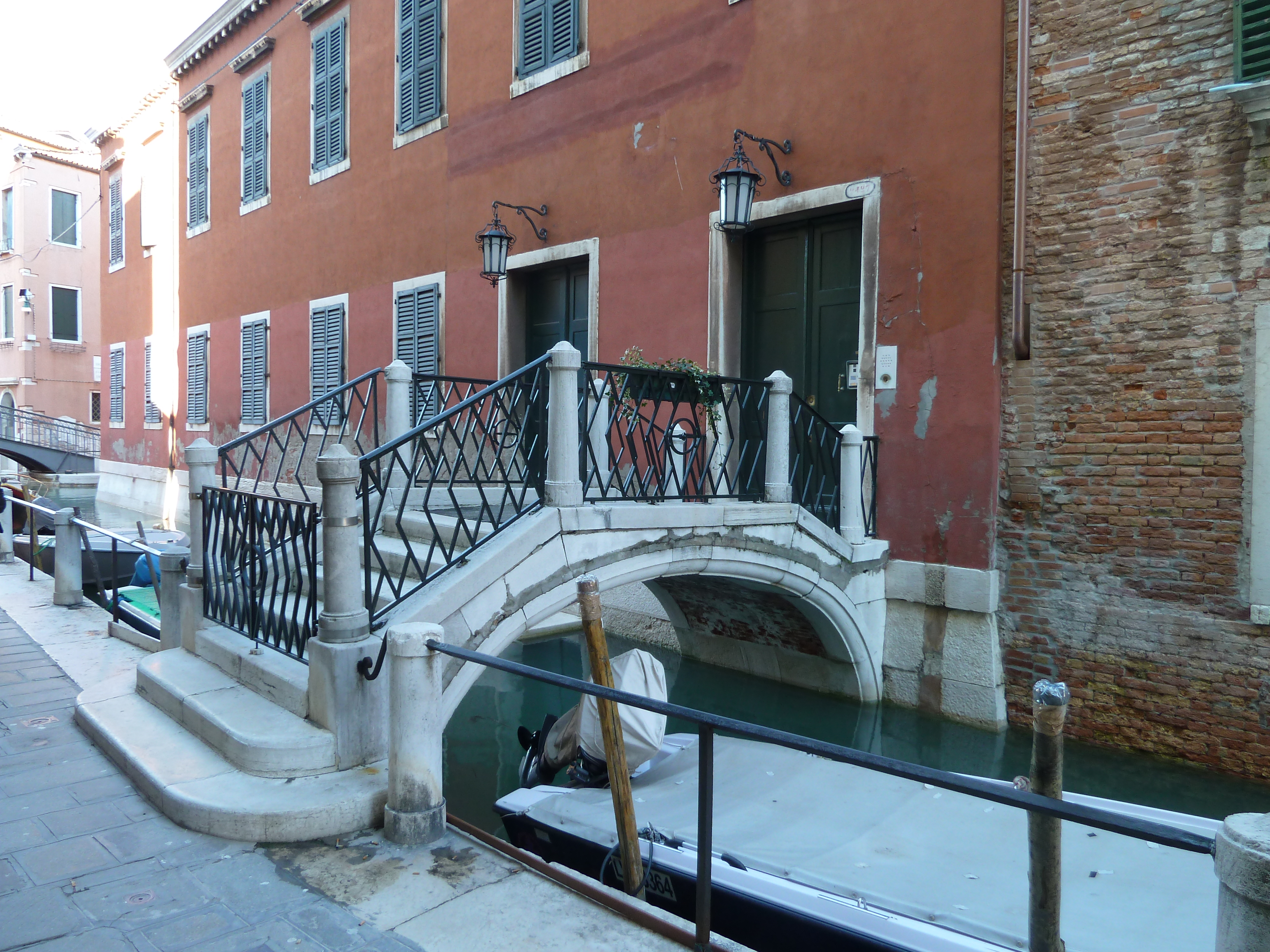
Ponte dell' Inferno (private)
Rio di San Martino

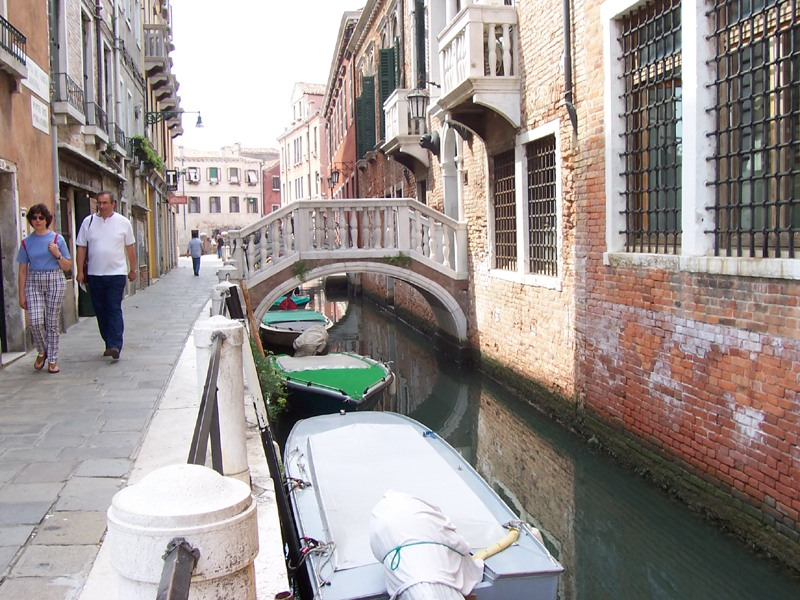
Ponte del Purgatorio (private)
Rio di San Martino

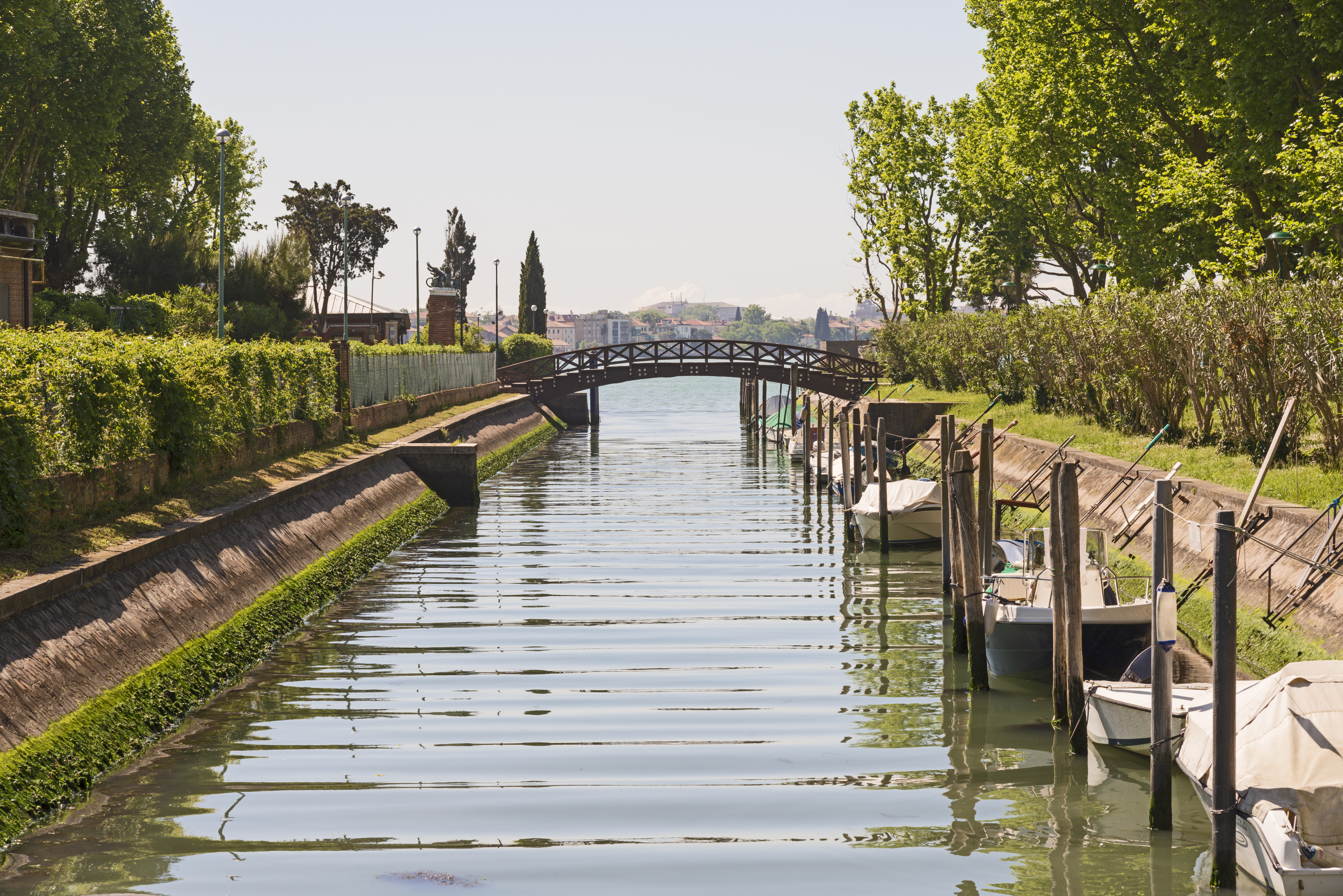
Ponte della Scuola navale
Rio de Sant'Elena

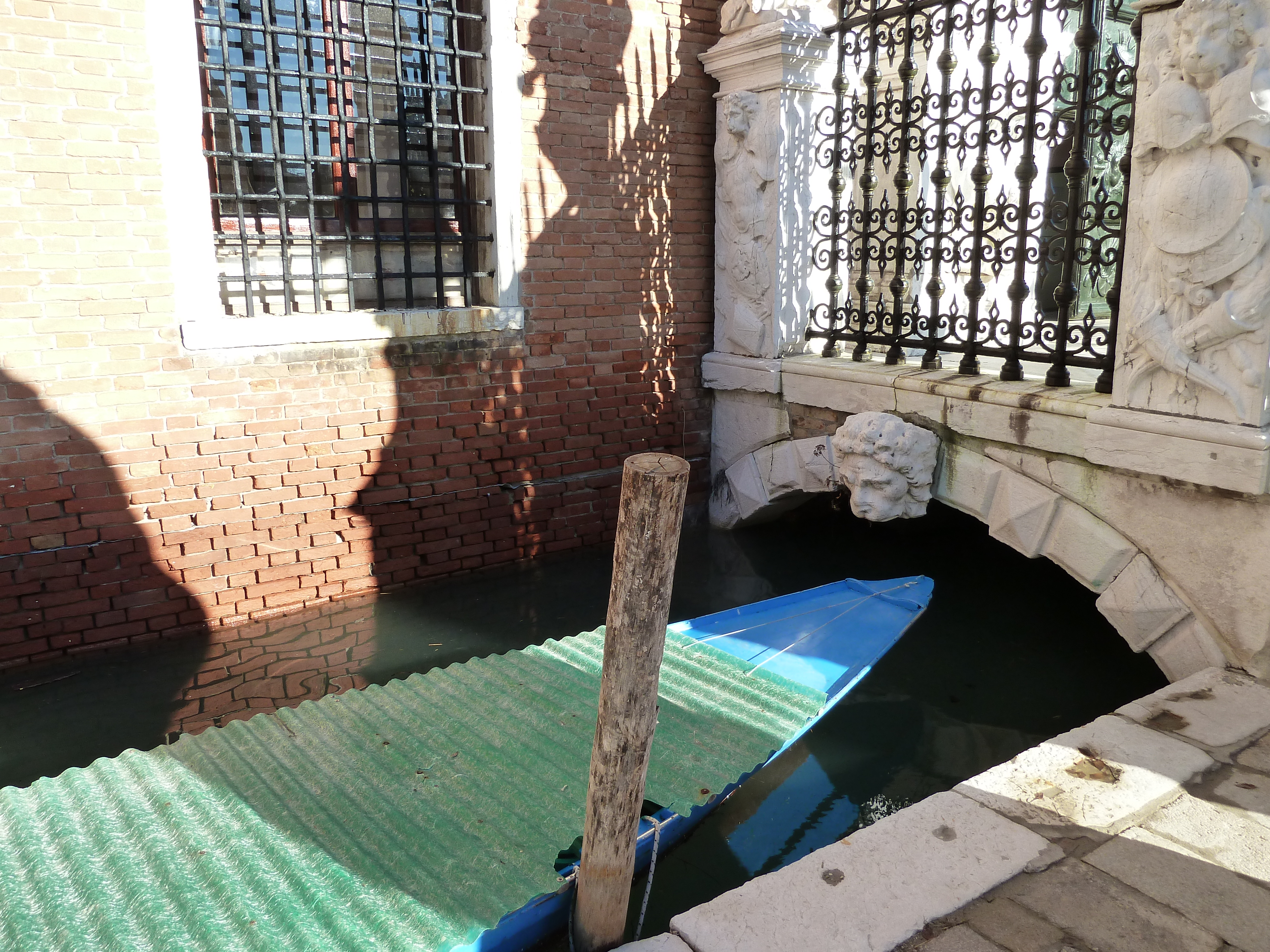
Bridge under the land entrance of the Arsénal

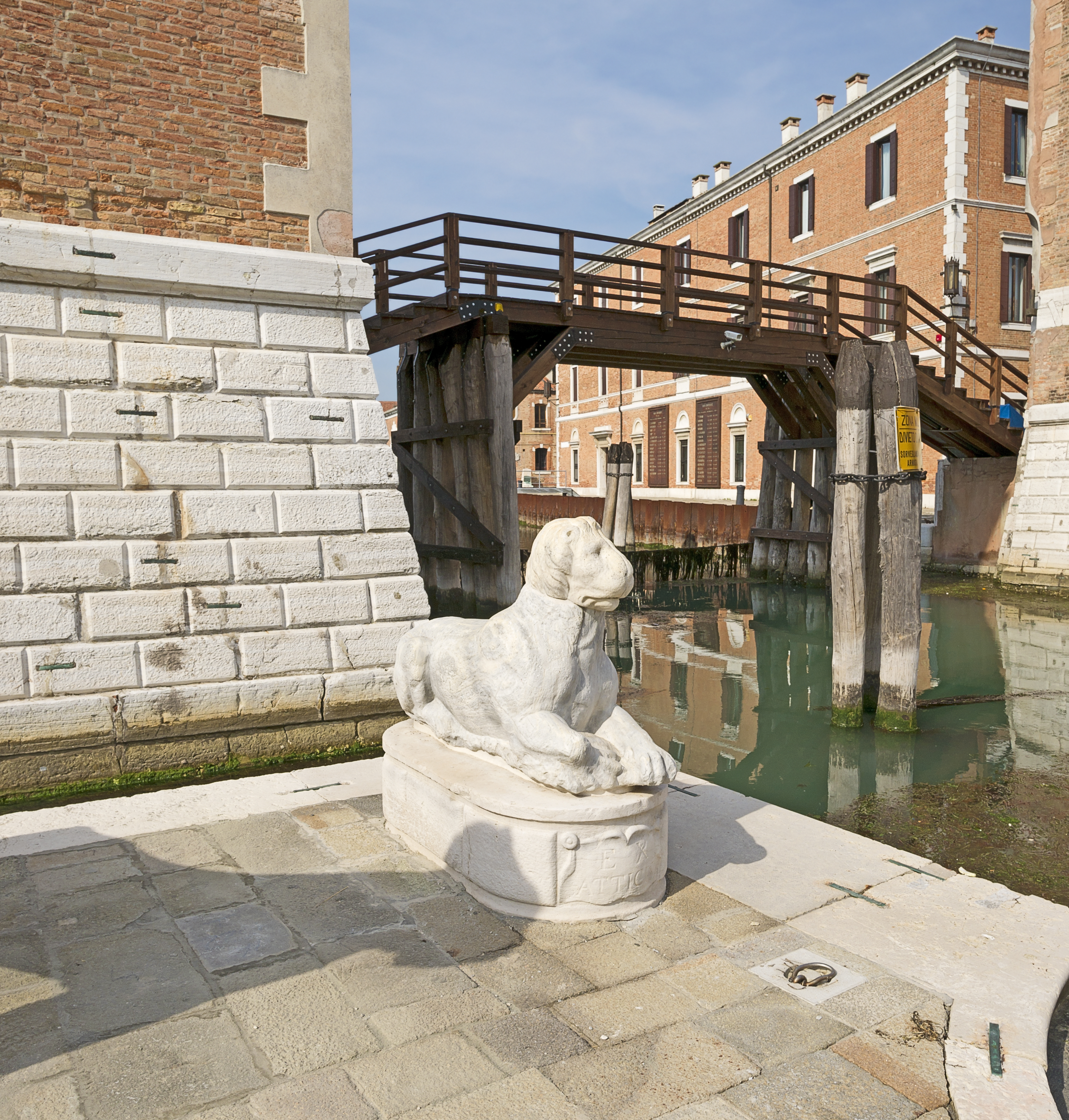
Private bridge inside the Arsenal

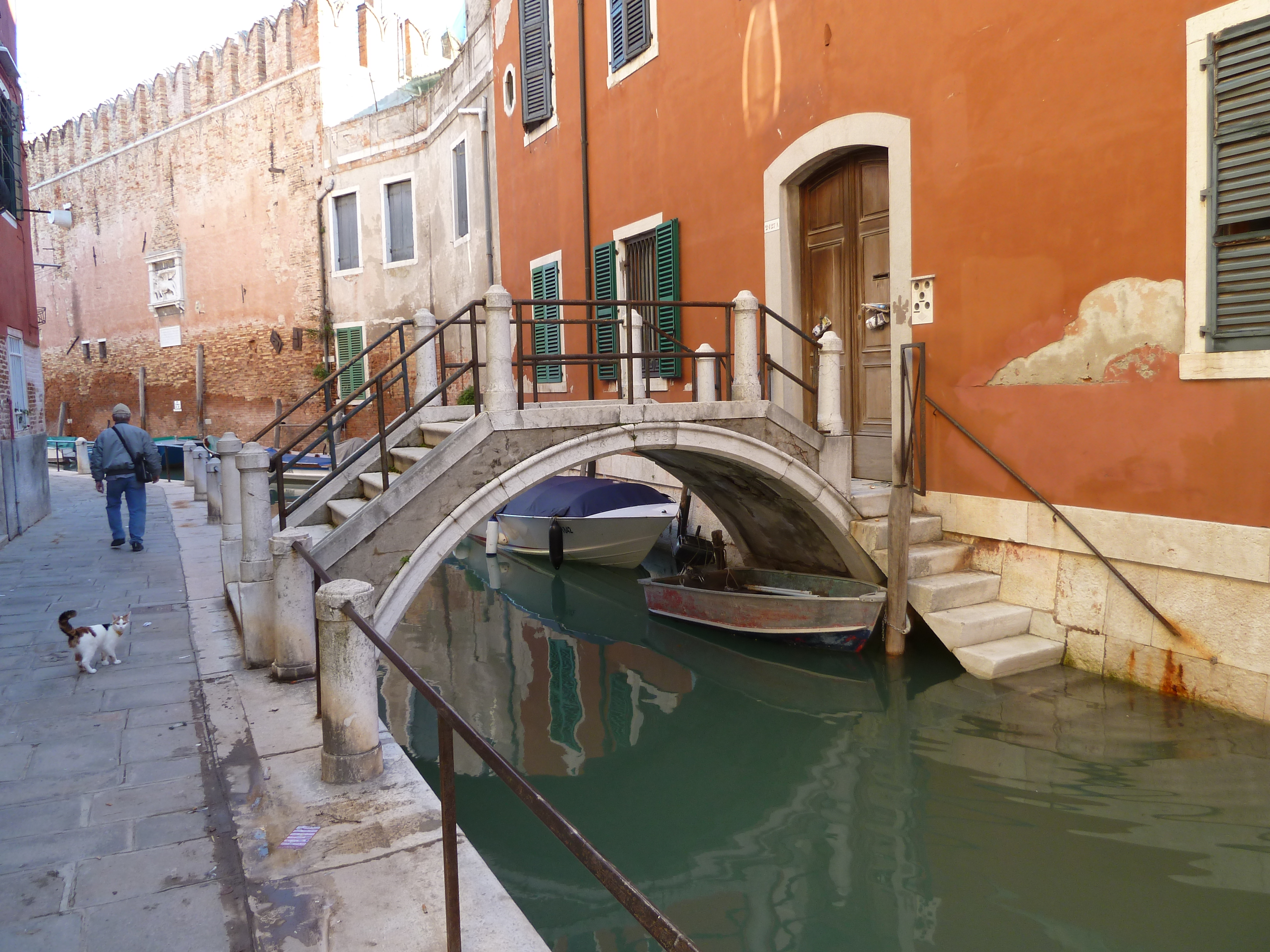
private bridge of the Arsenaletto
rio delle Gorne

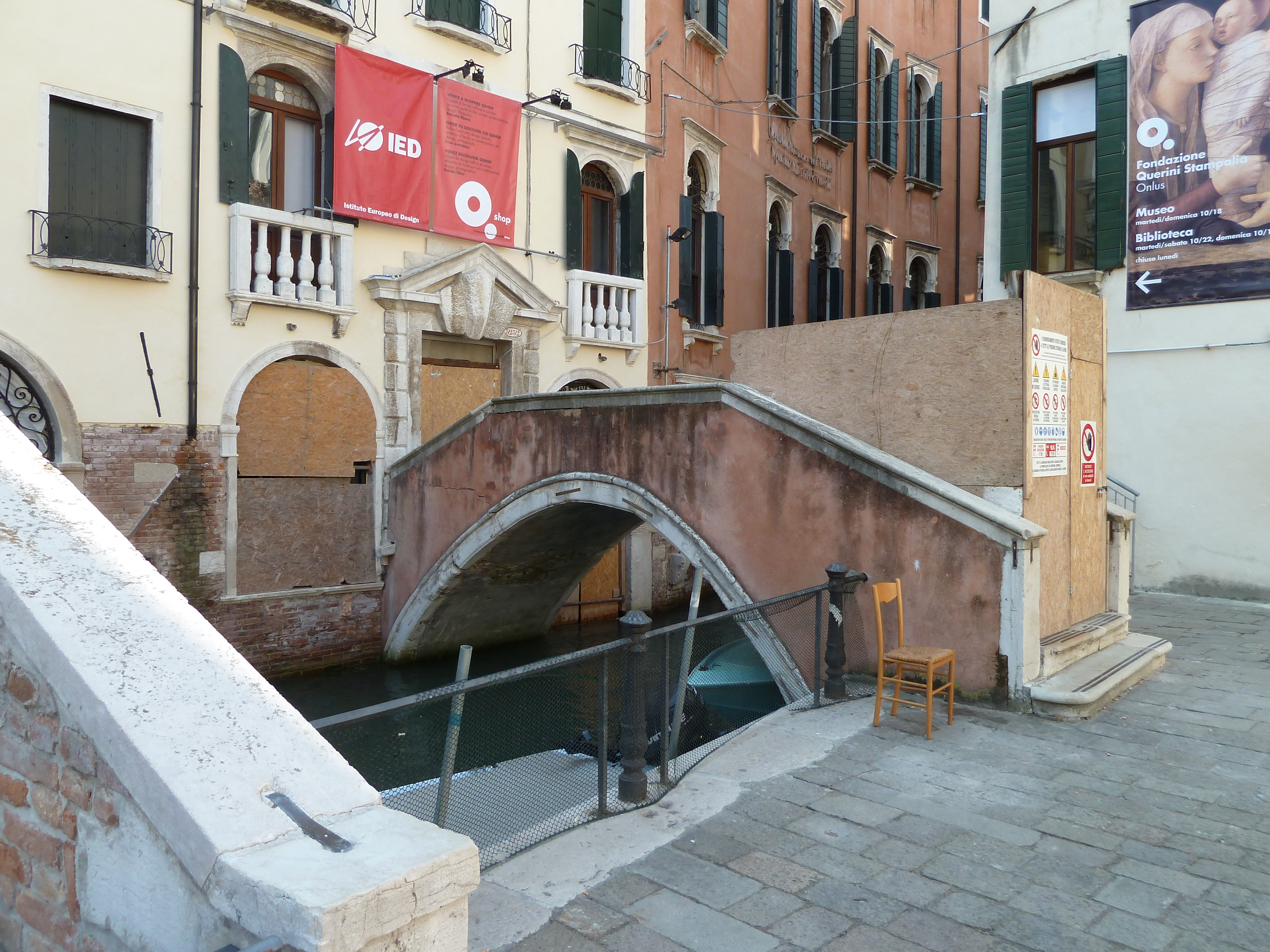
private bridge of the Ca' Loredan
Rio de Santa Maria Formosa

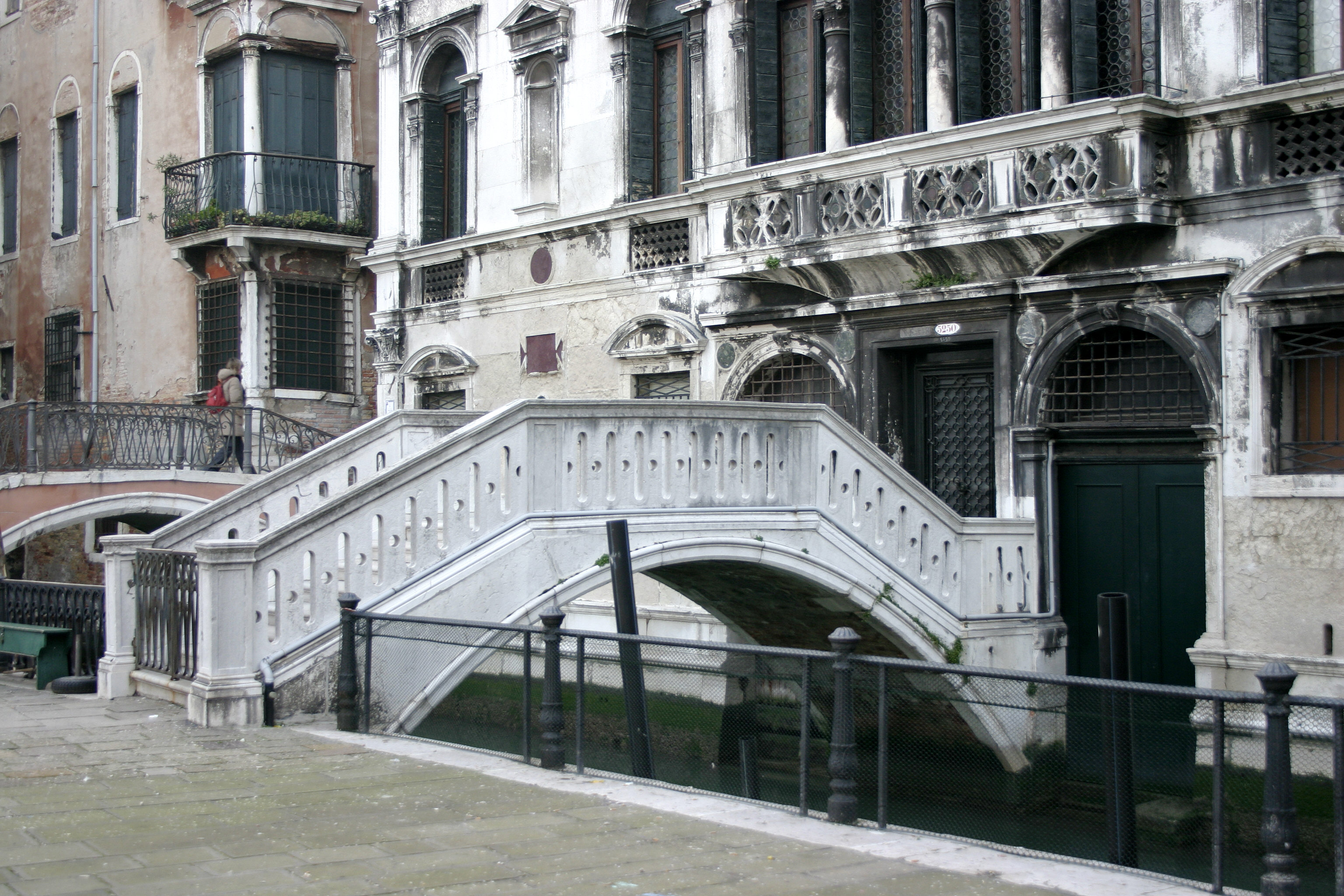
private bridge of the palais Malipiero Trevisan
Rio de Santa Maria Formosa

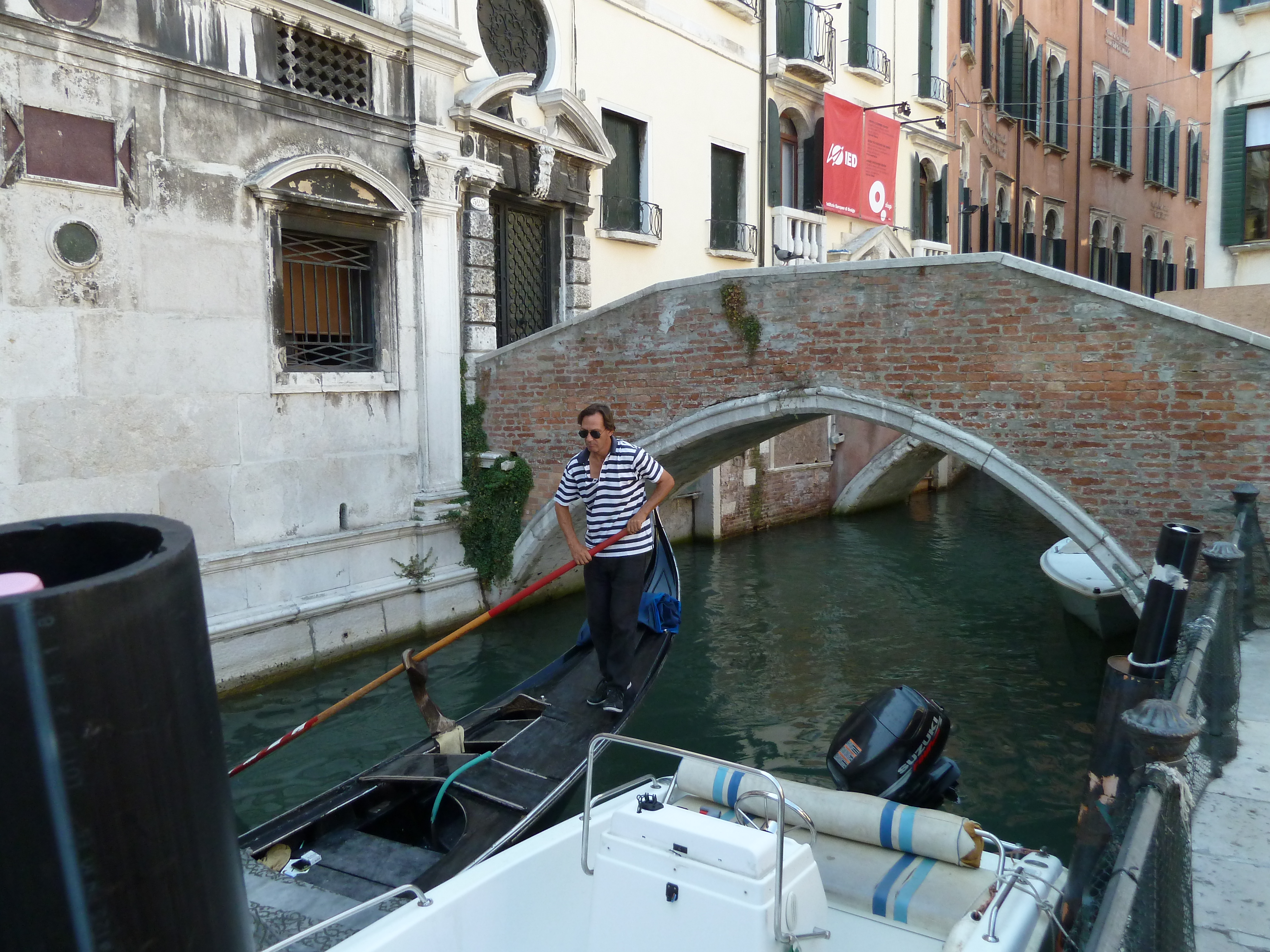
2nd private bridge of the palais Malipiero Trevisan
Rio de Santa Maria Formosa

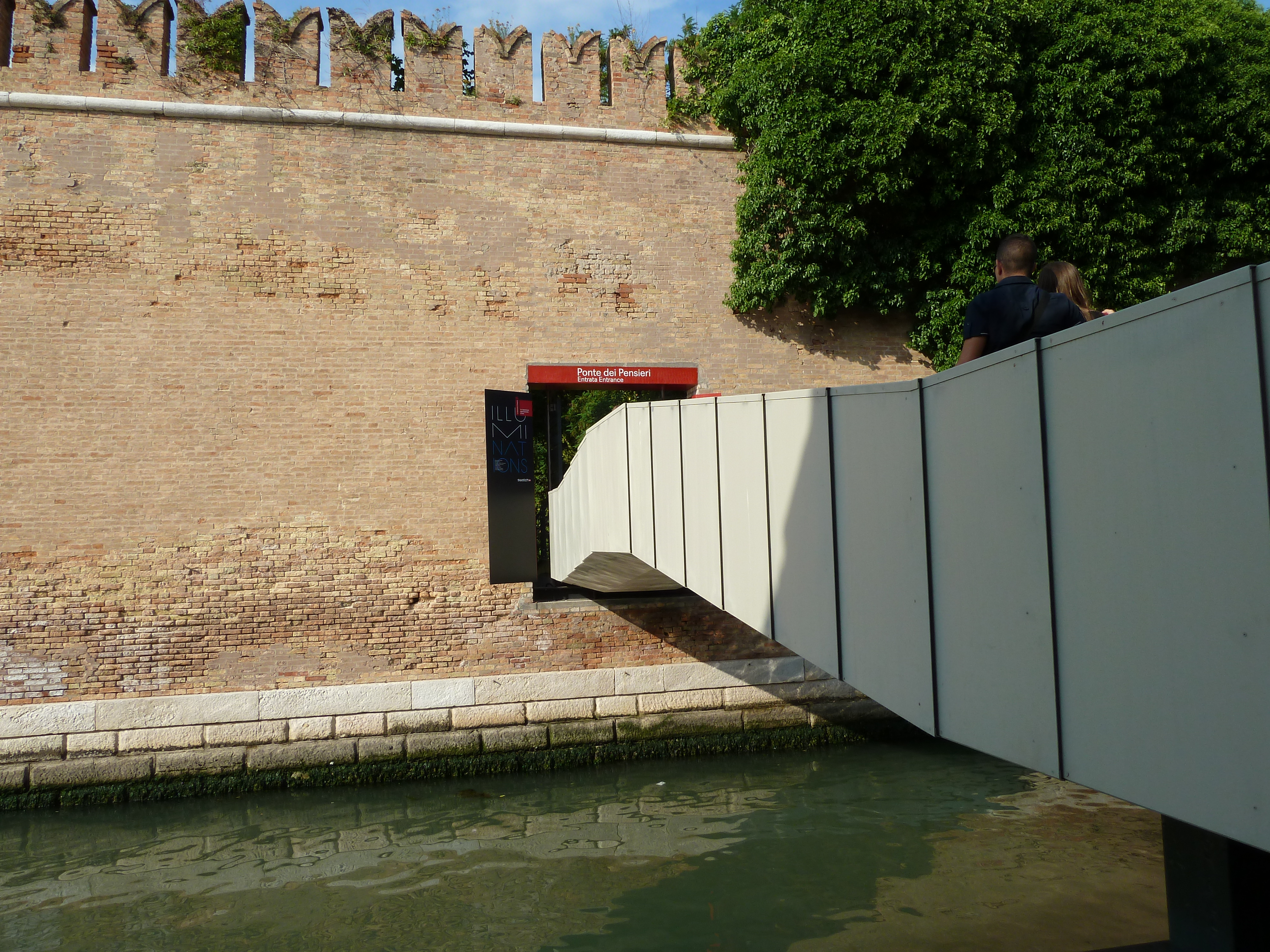
Ponte dei Pensieri
rio de le Vergine

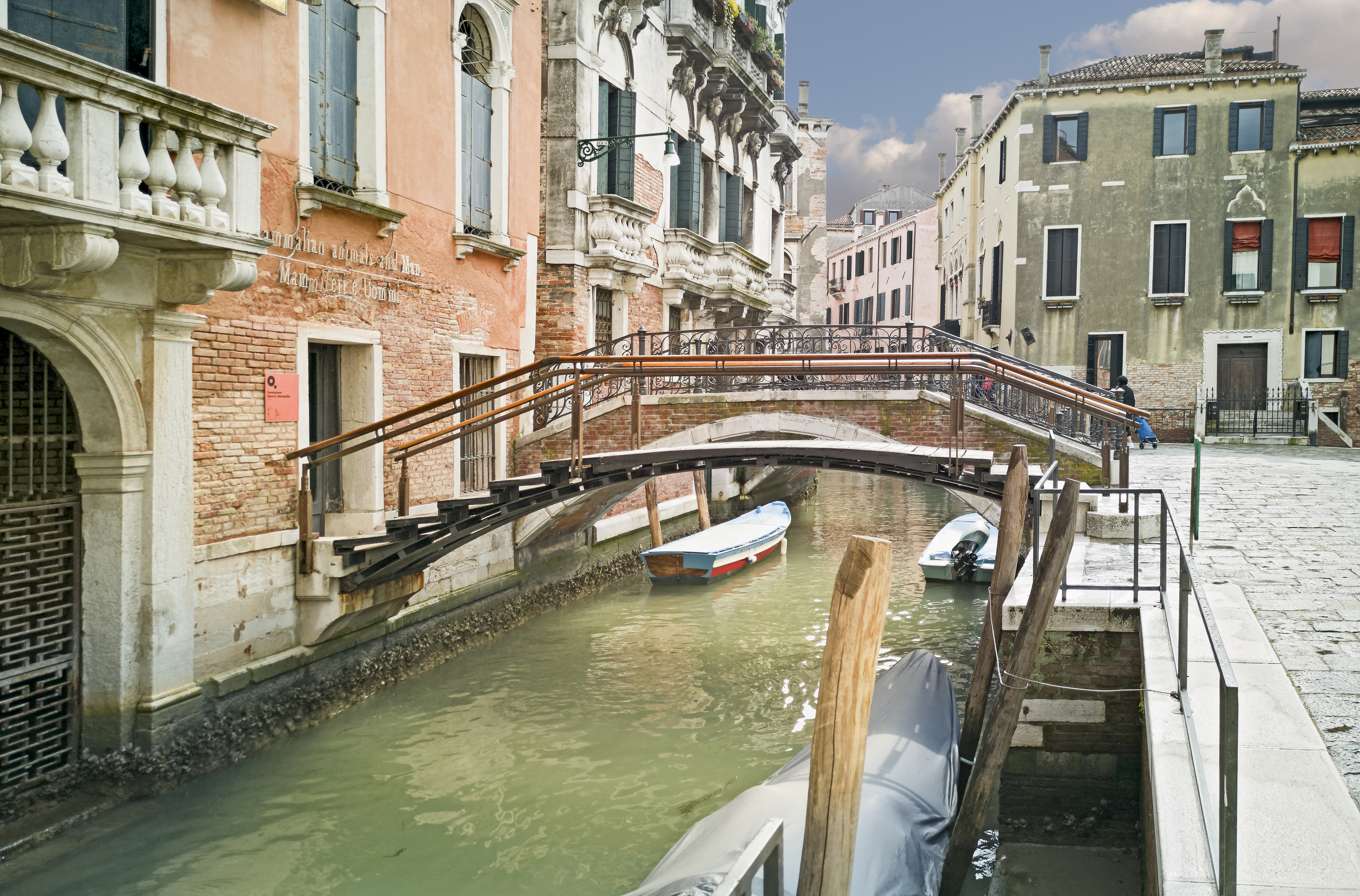
private bridge of the Fondazione Querini Stampalia // Rio de Santa Maria Formosa

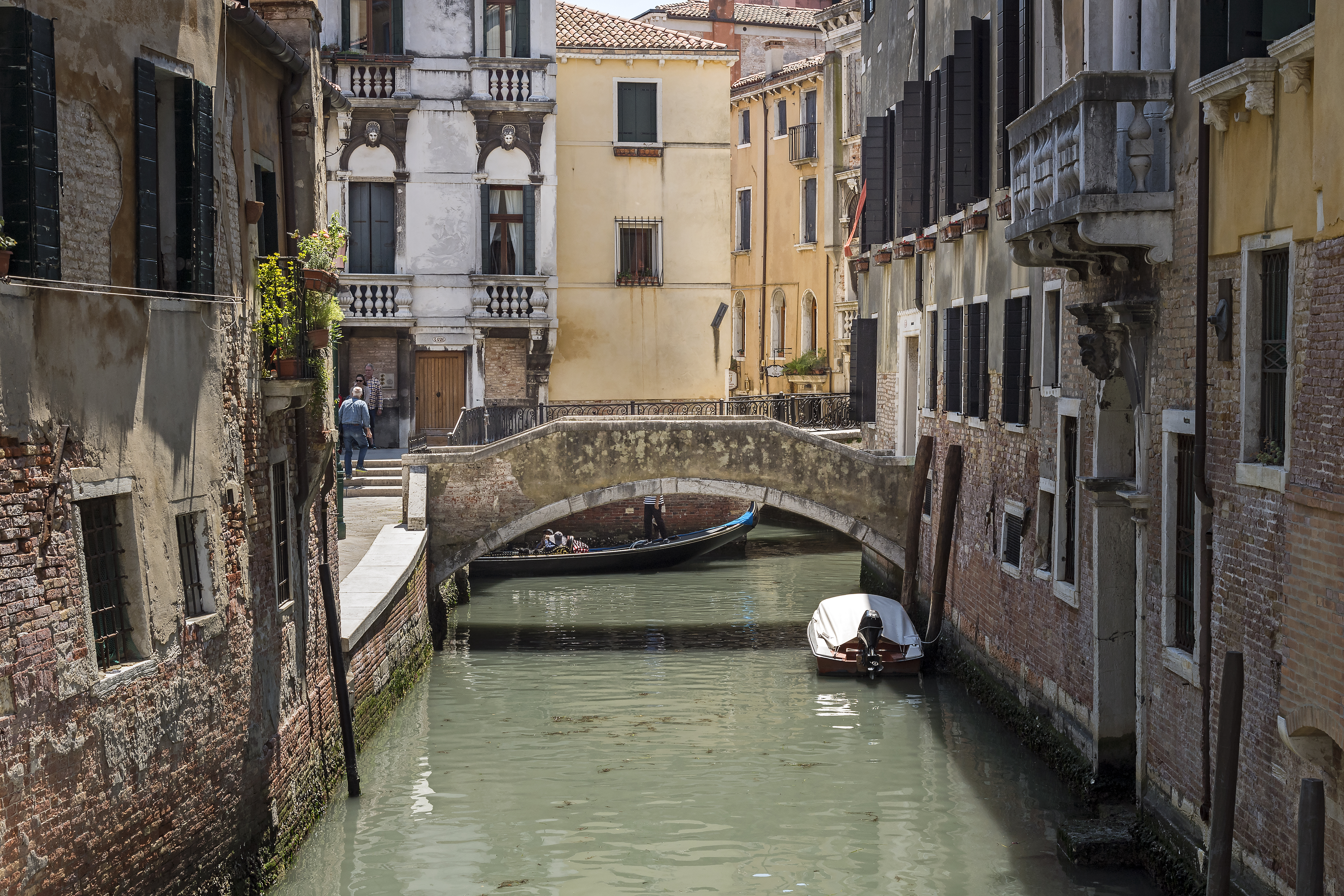
Private bridge, Campiello Querini Stampalia
rio del Mondo Novo

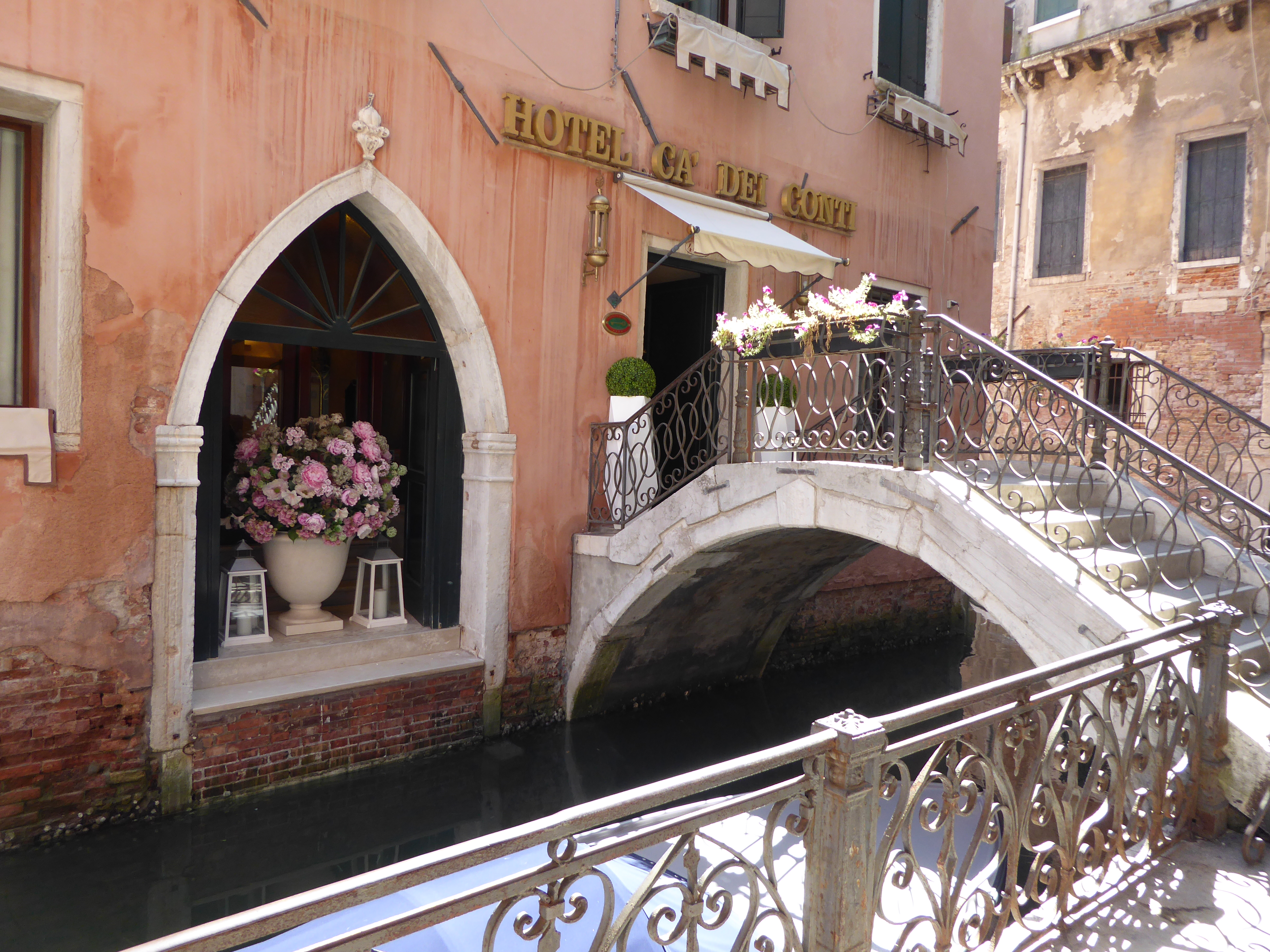
private bridge of the hotel Ca del Conte
Rio de San Zaninovo

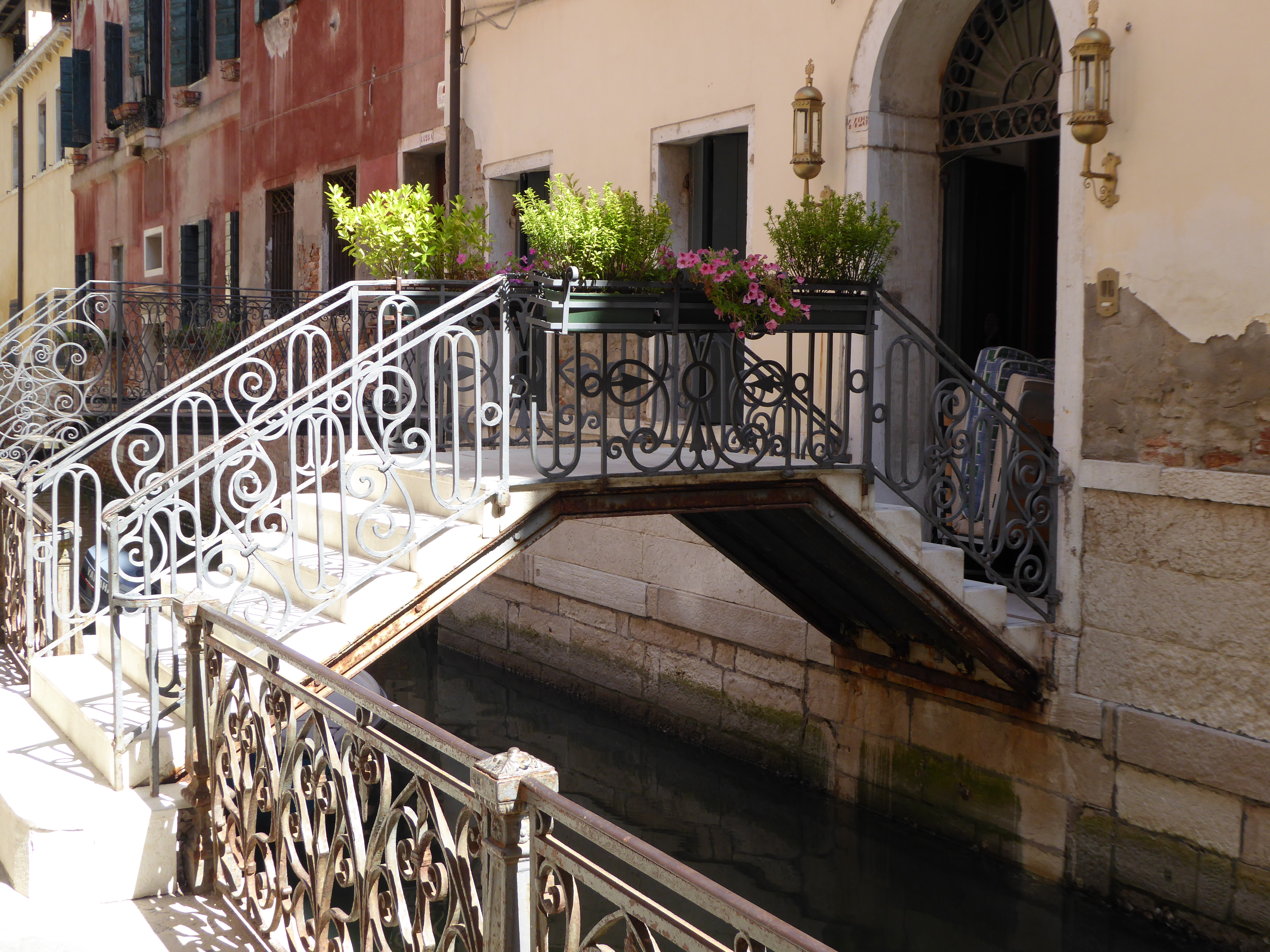
2nd private bridge of the hotel Ca del Conte
Rio de San Zaninovo

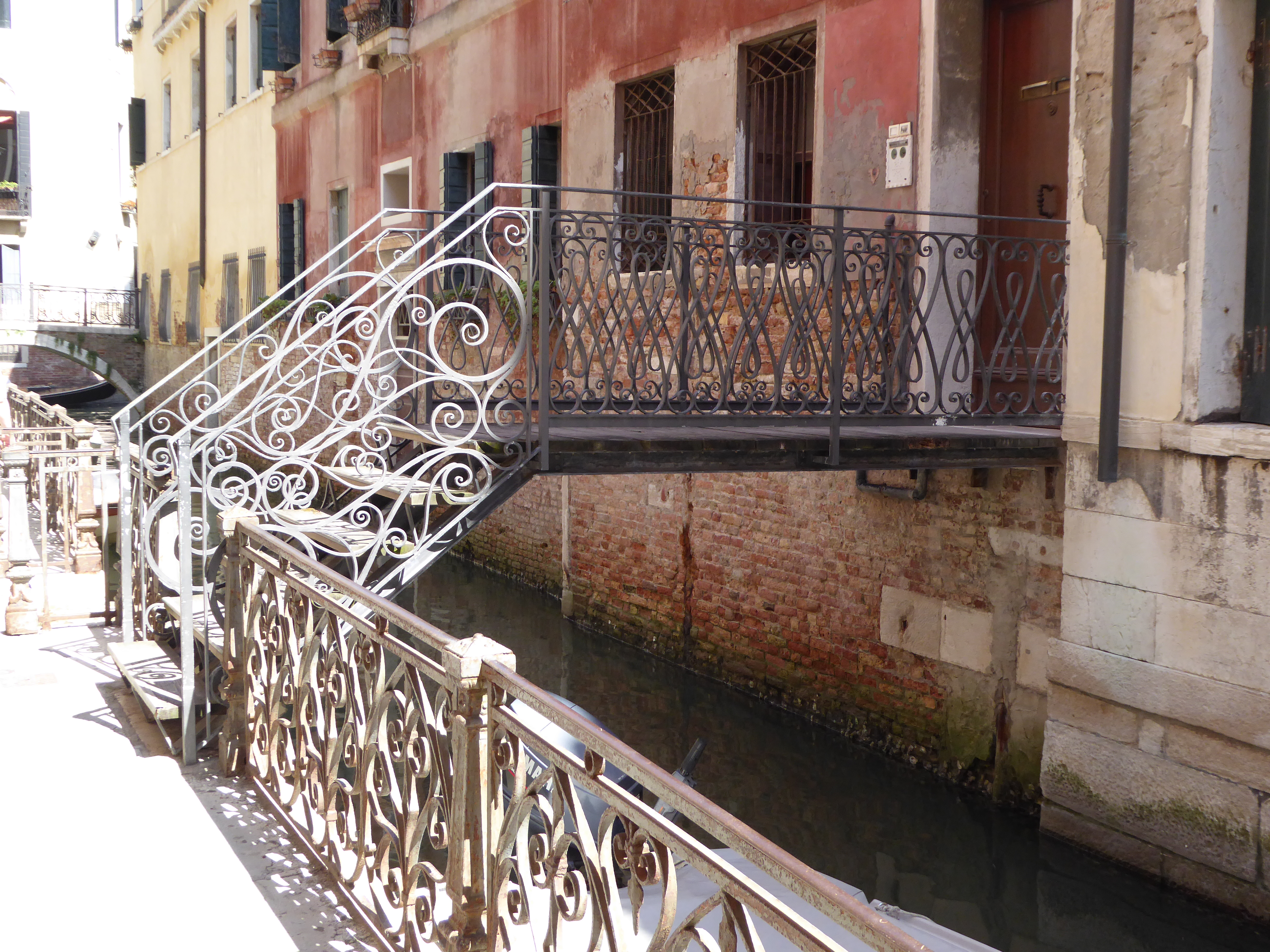
3rd private bridge of the hotel Ca del Conte
Rio de San Zaninovo

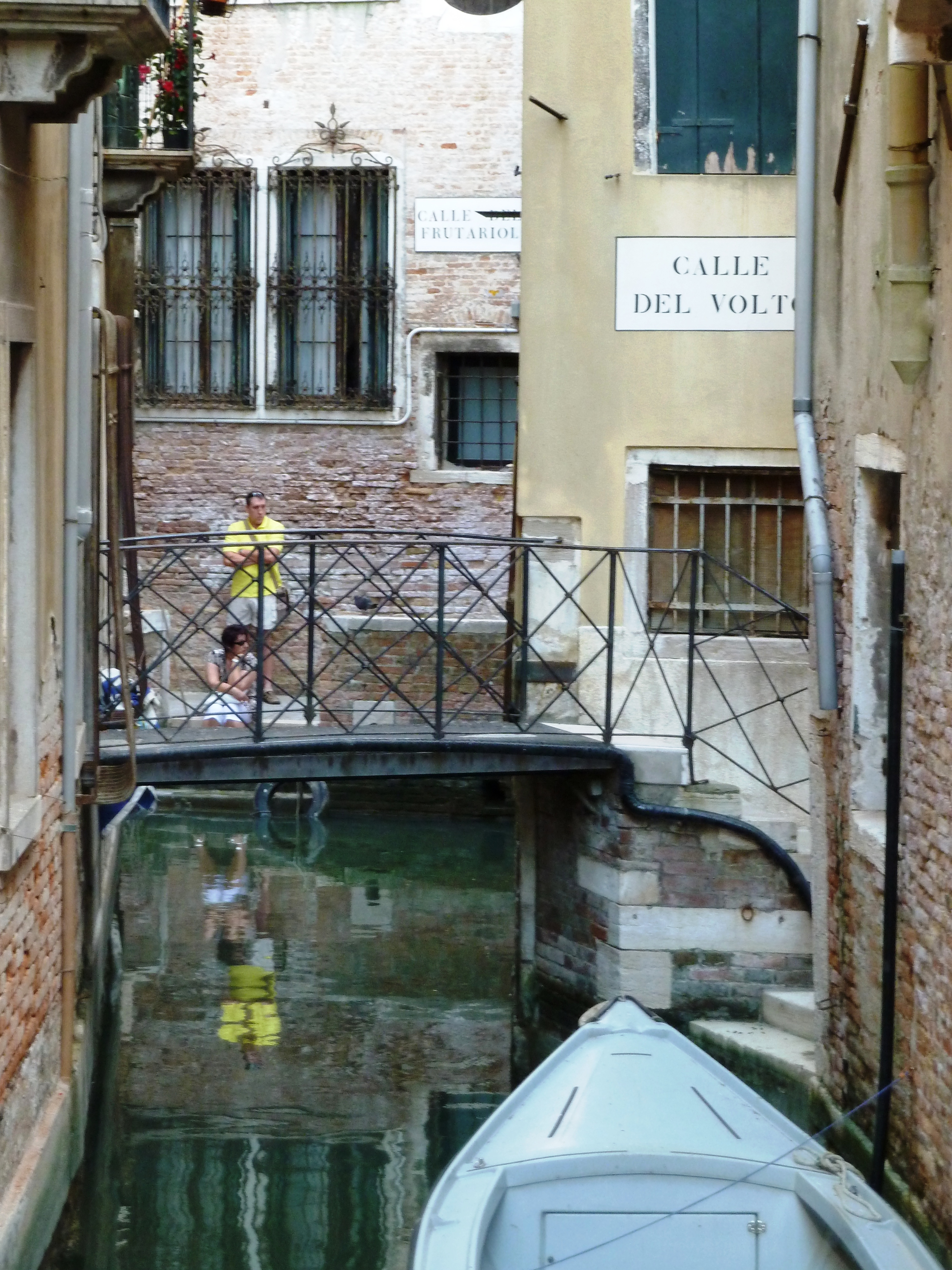
private bridge calle del Volto
Rio del Piombo

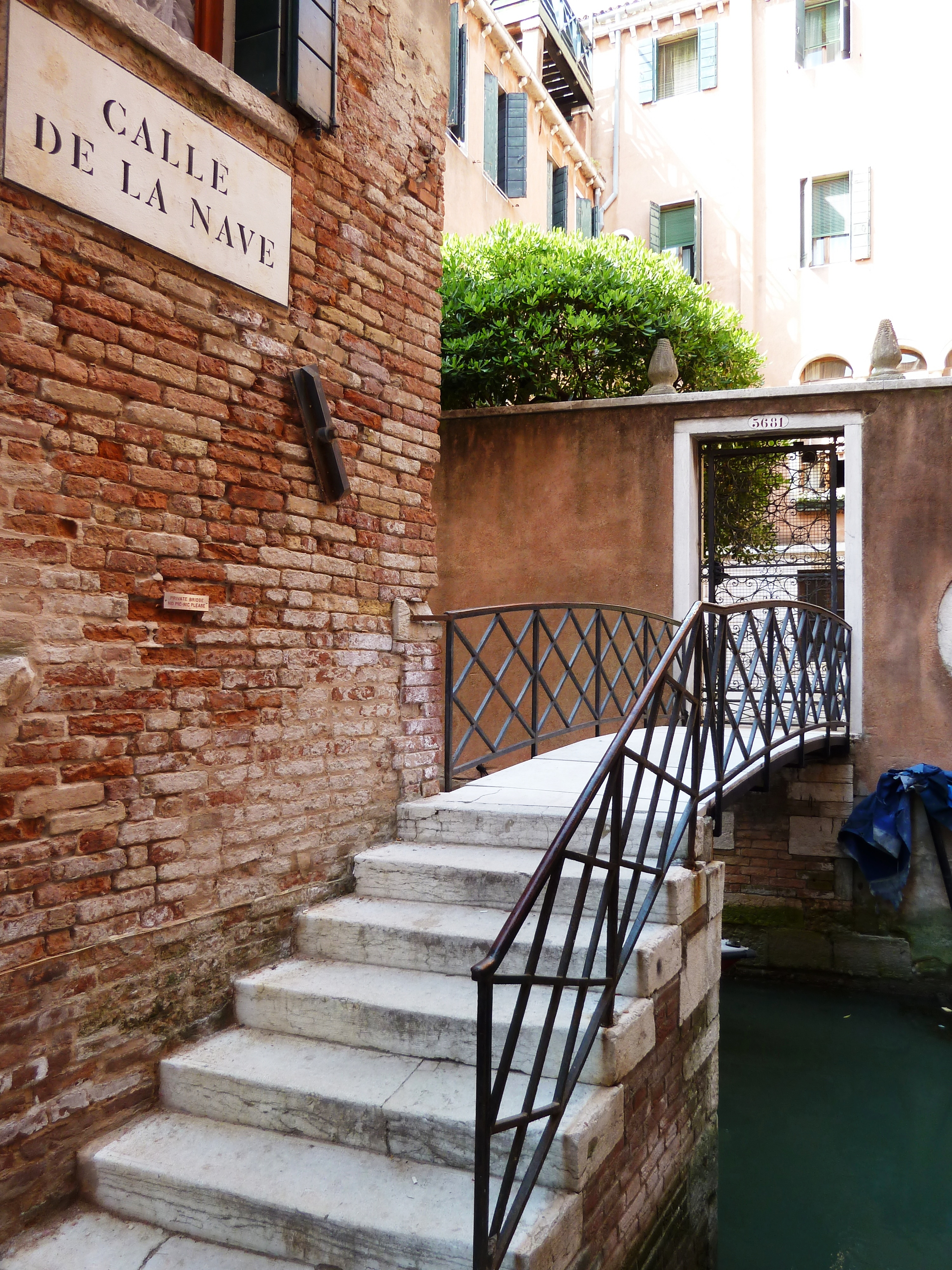
private bridge calle de la Nave
Rio del Piombo

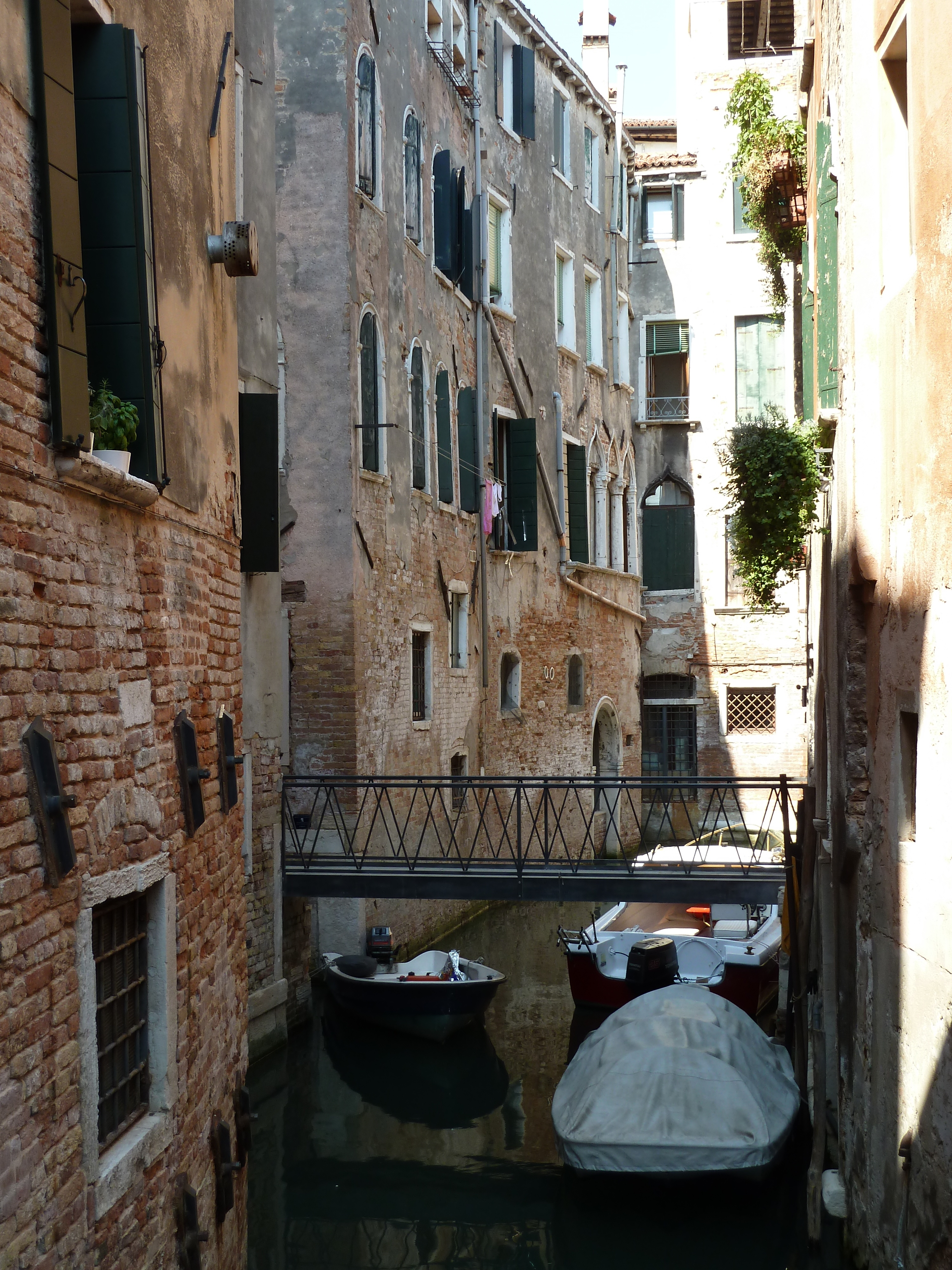
private bridge calle de le Vele
Rio del Piombo

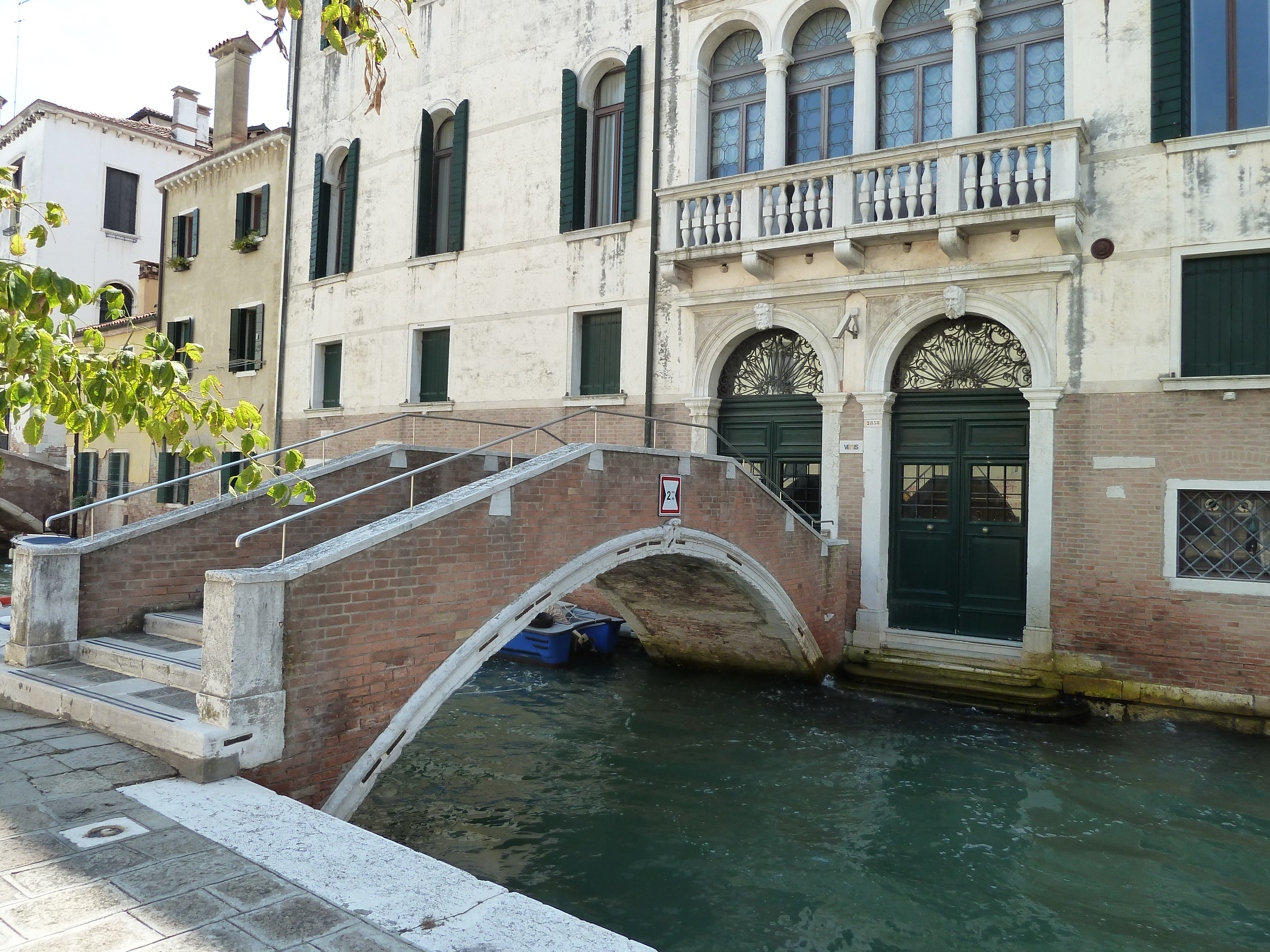
private bridge of the palazzo Gradenigo a S.Giustina
Rio de San Francesco de la Vigna

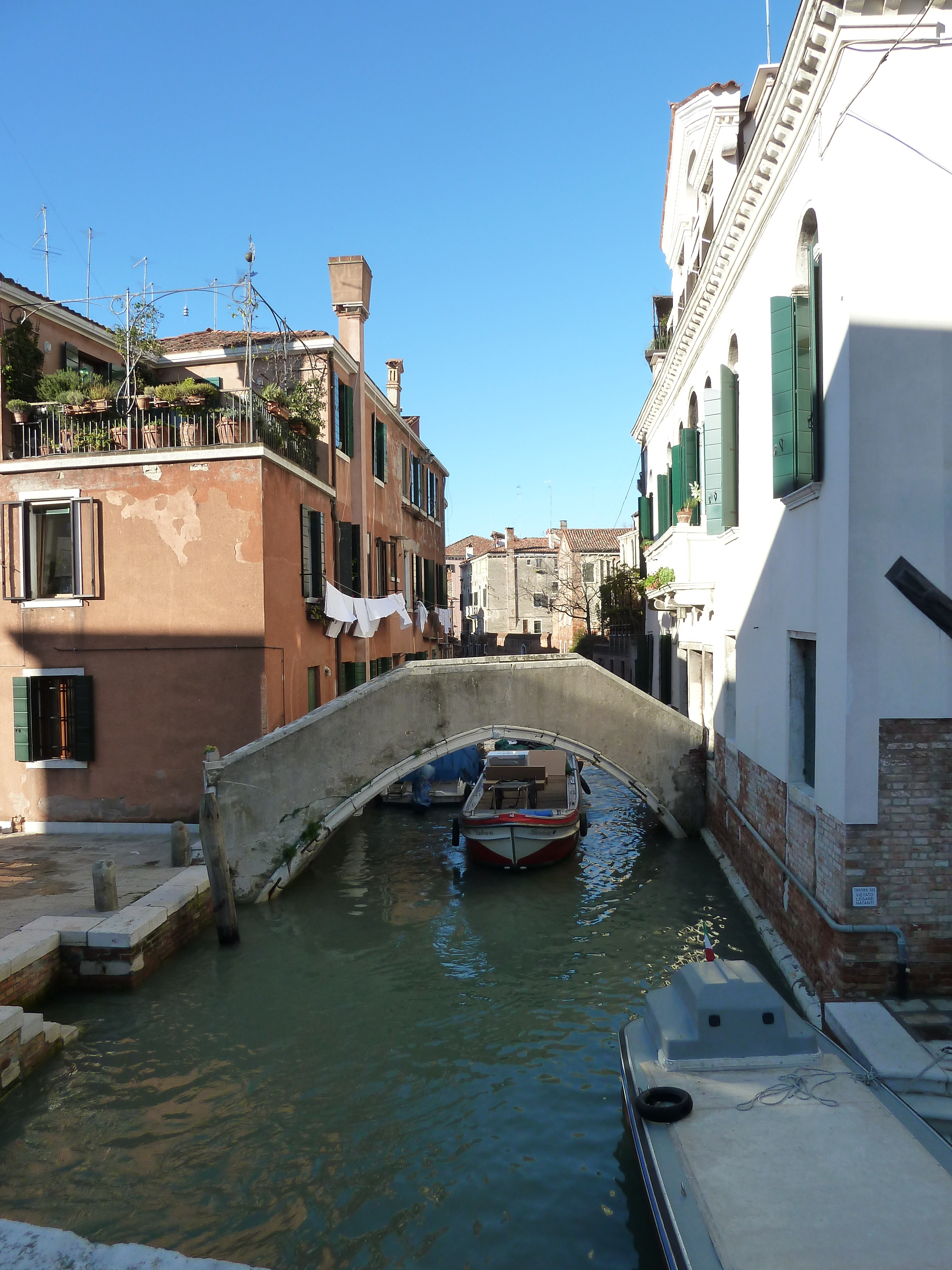
private bridge Ca'Sagredo a S.Ternita
Rio de la Celestia

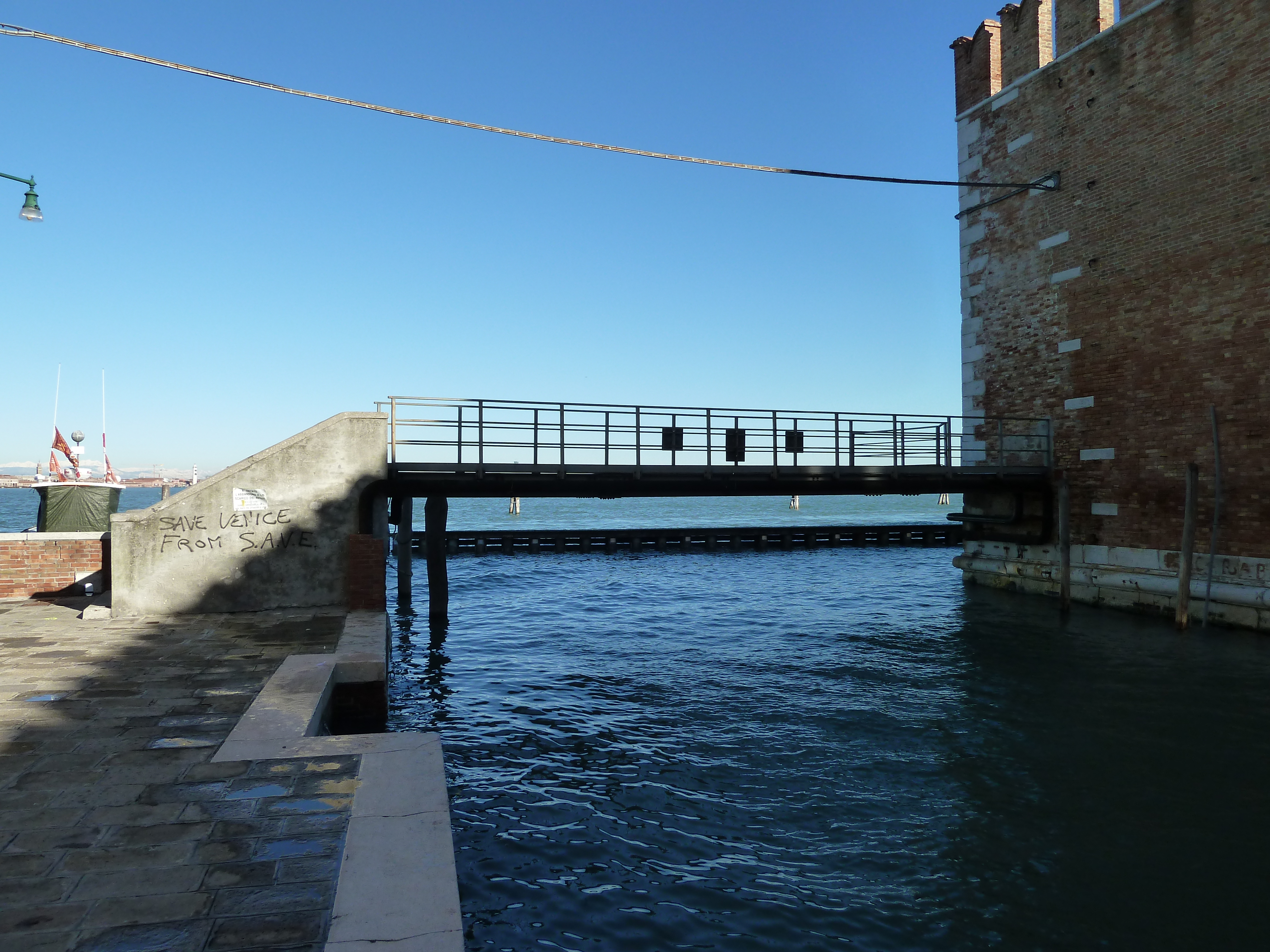
private bridge over the rielo drio la Celestia

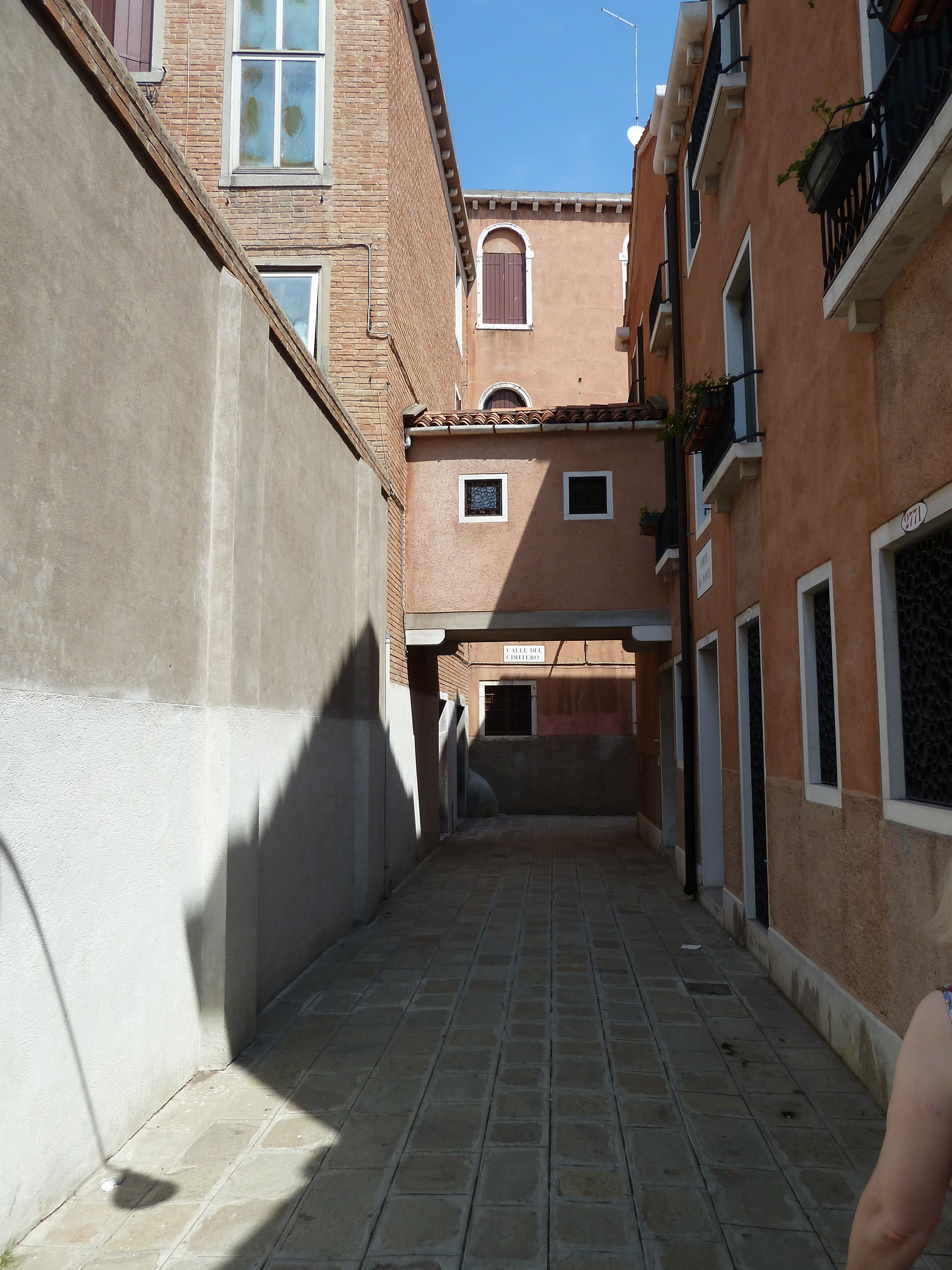
private bridge calle del cimitero

== Sestieri of Santa Croce ==
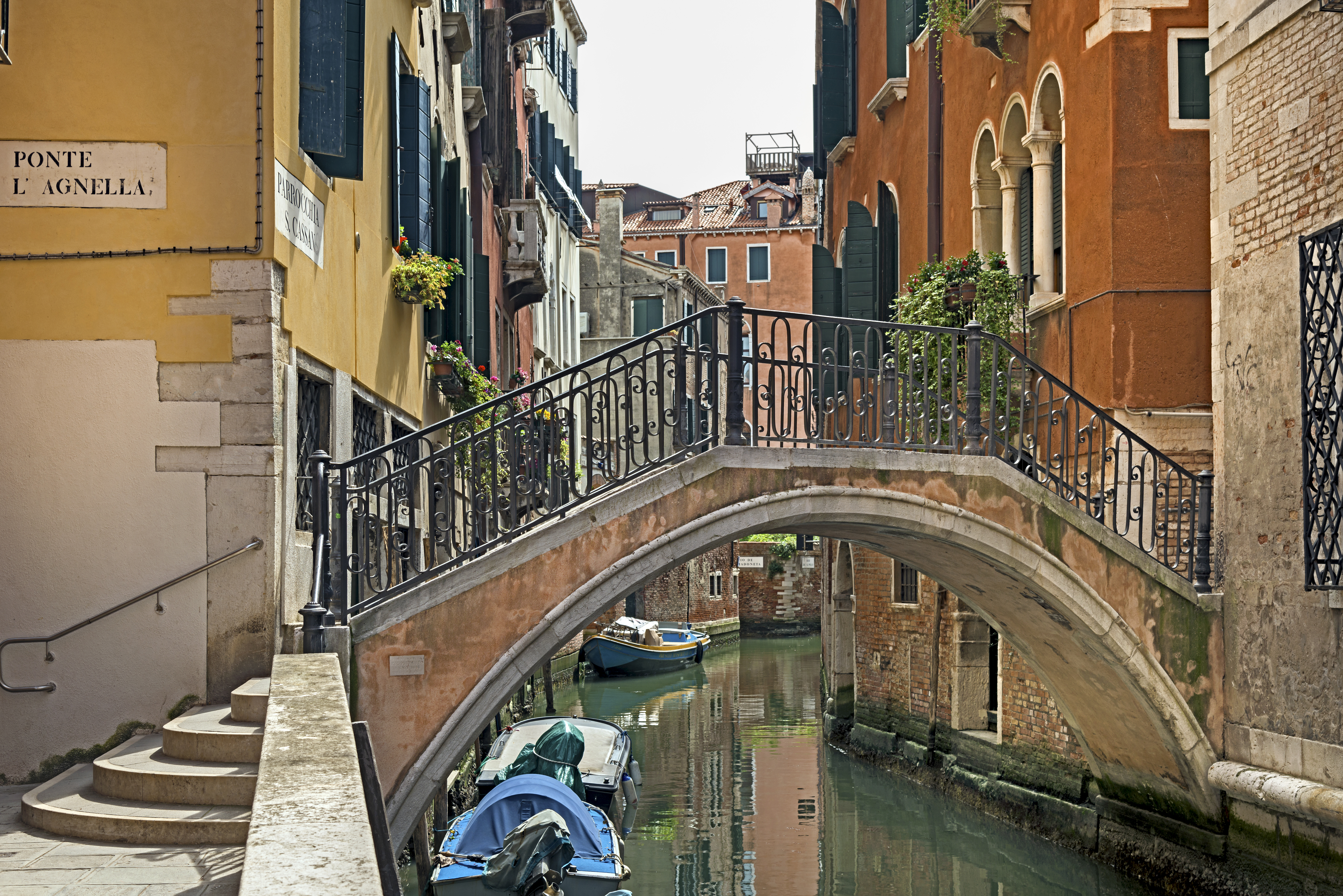
Ponte de l'Agnella
Rio delle Due Torri

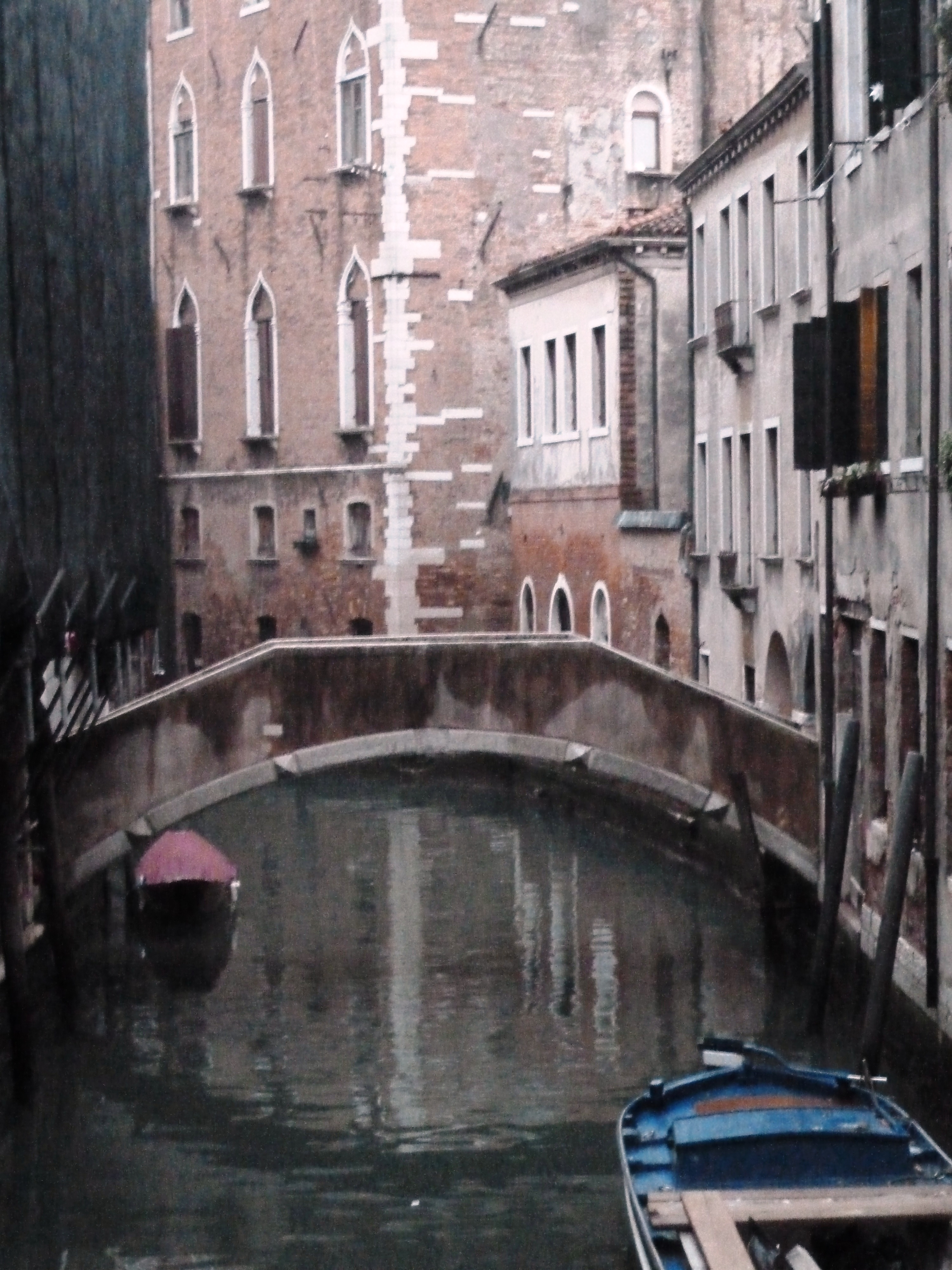
Ponte de l'Anatomia
Rio San Zan Degolà

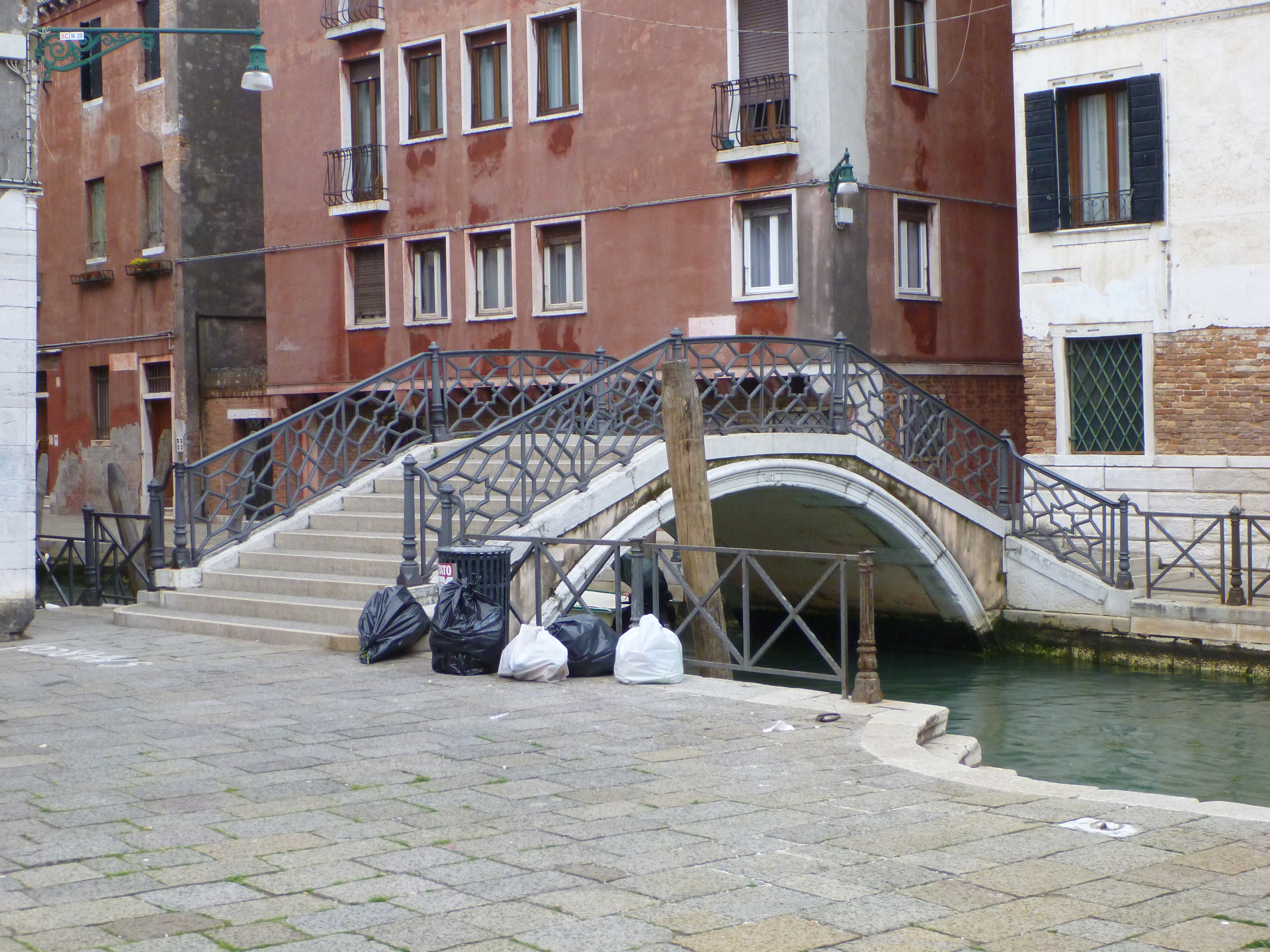
Ponte Bembo/San Zan Degolà
Rio de San Zan Degolà

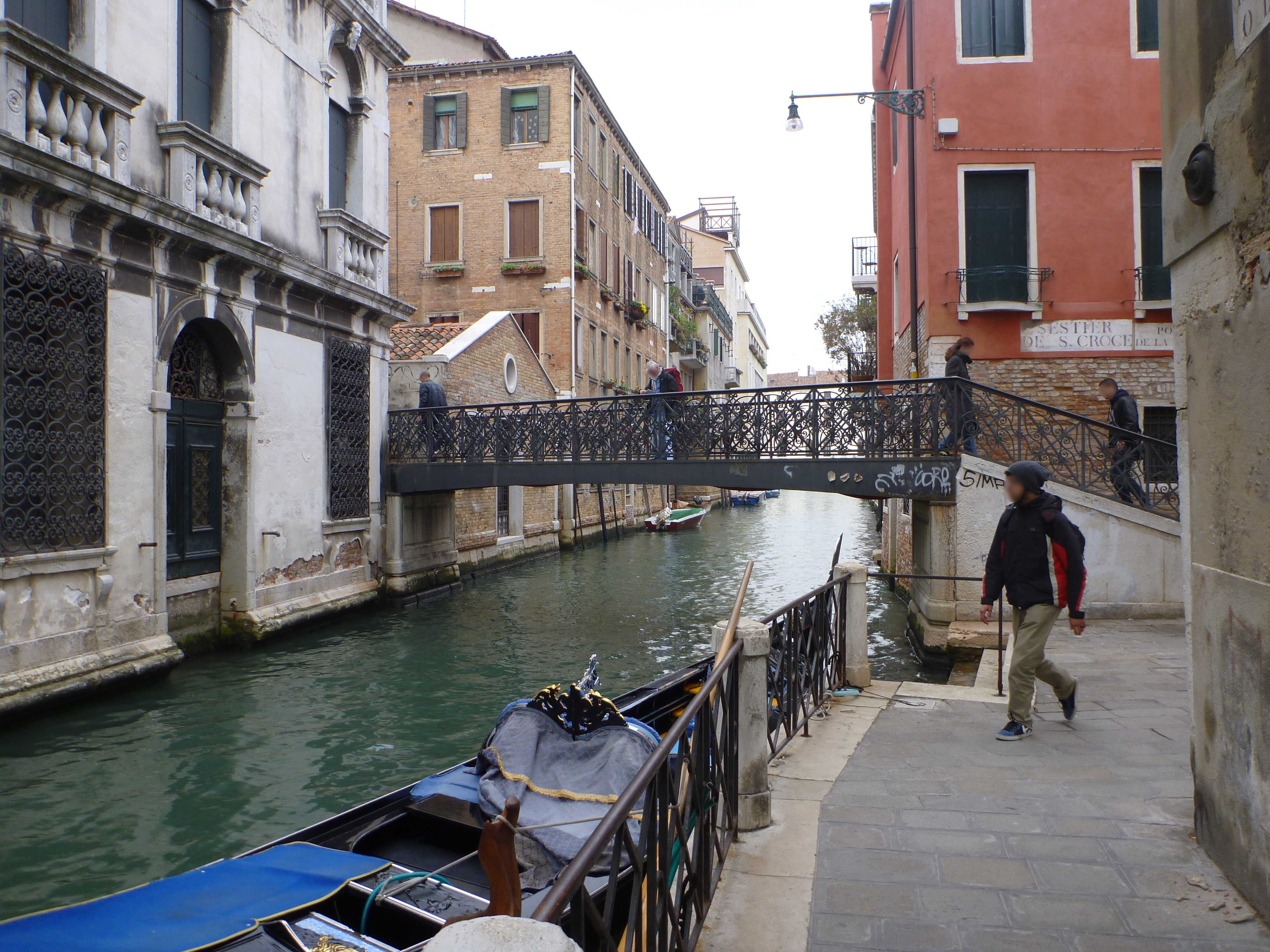
Ponte de la Bergami
Rio Marin

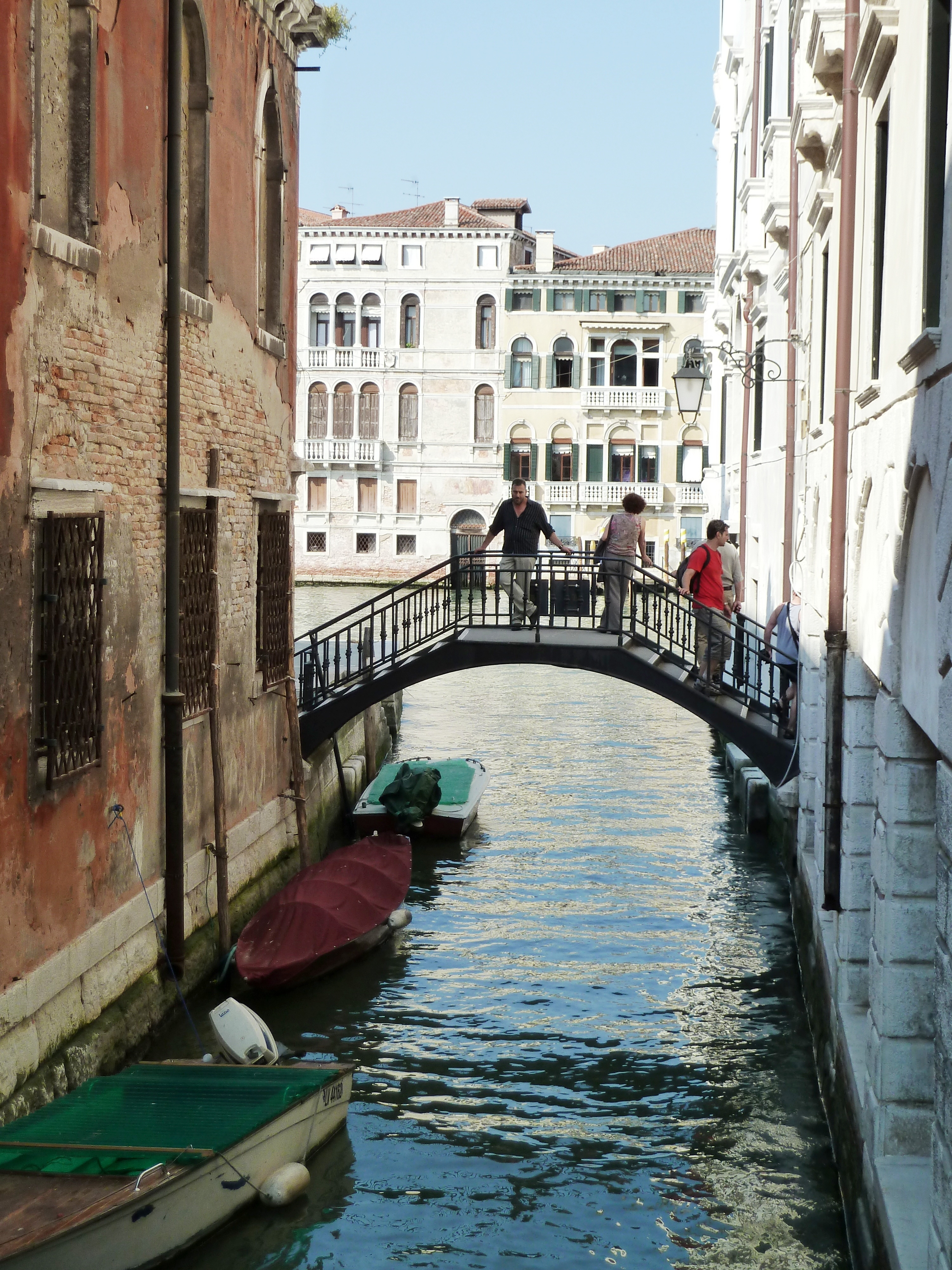
Ponte de Ca’Giovannelli
Rio de San Stae

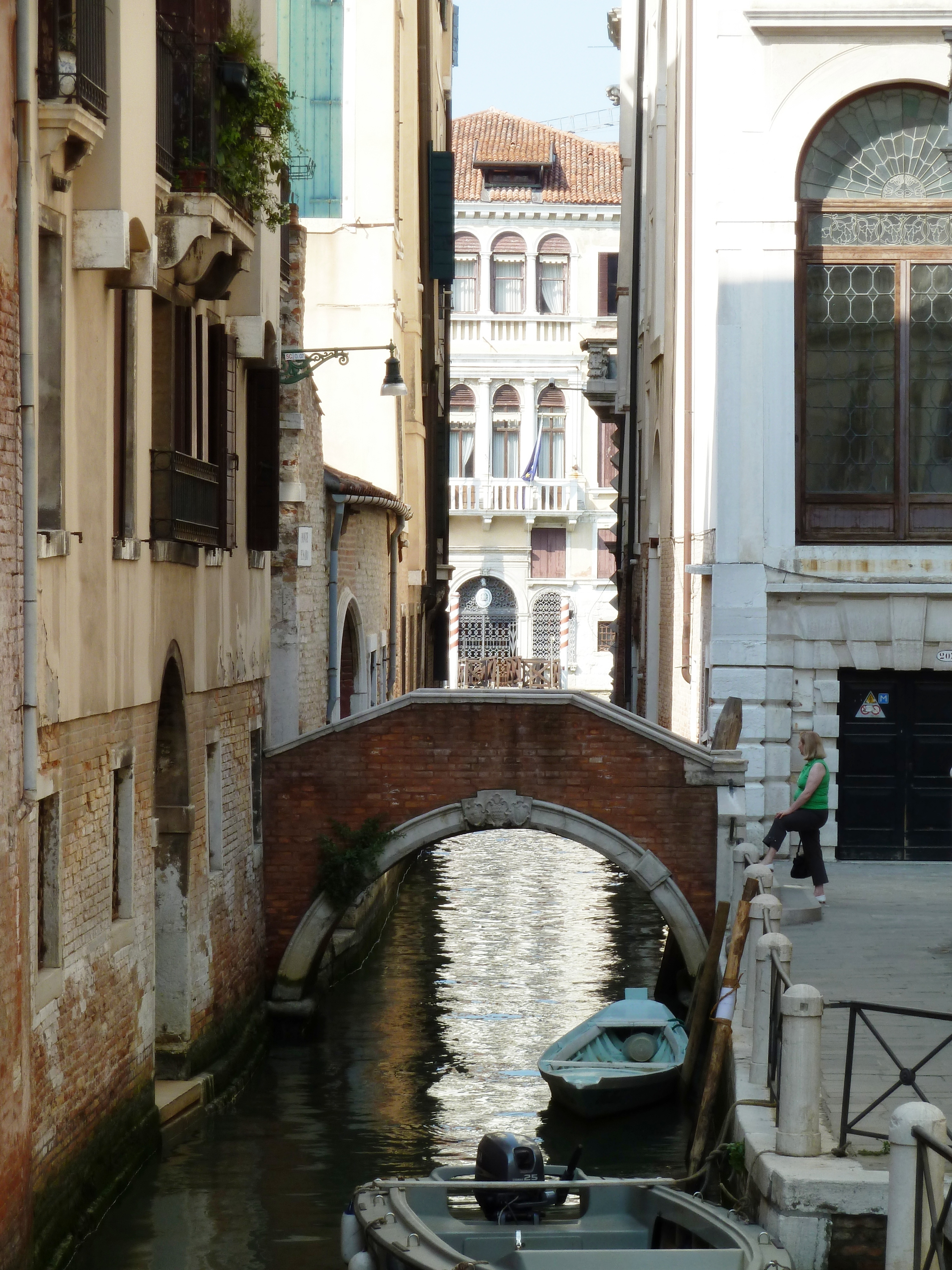
Ponte de Ca' Pesaro
Rio de la Pergola

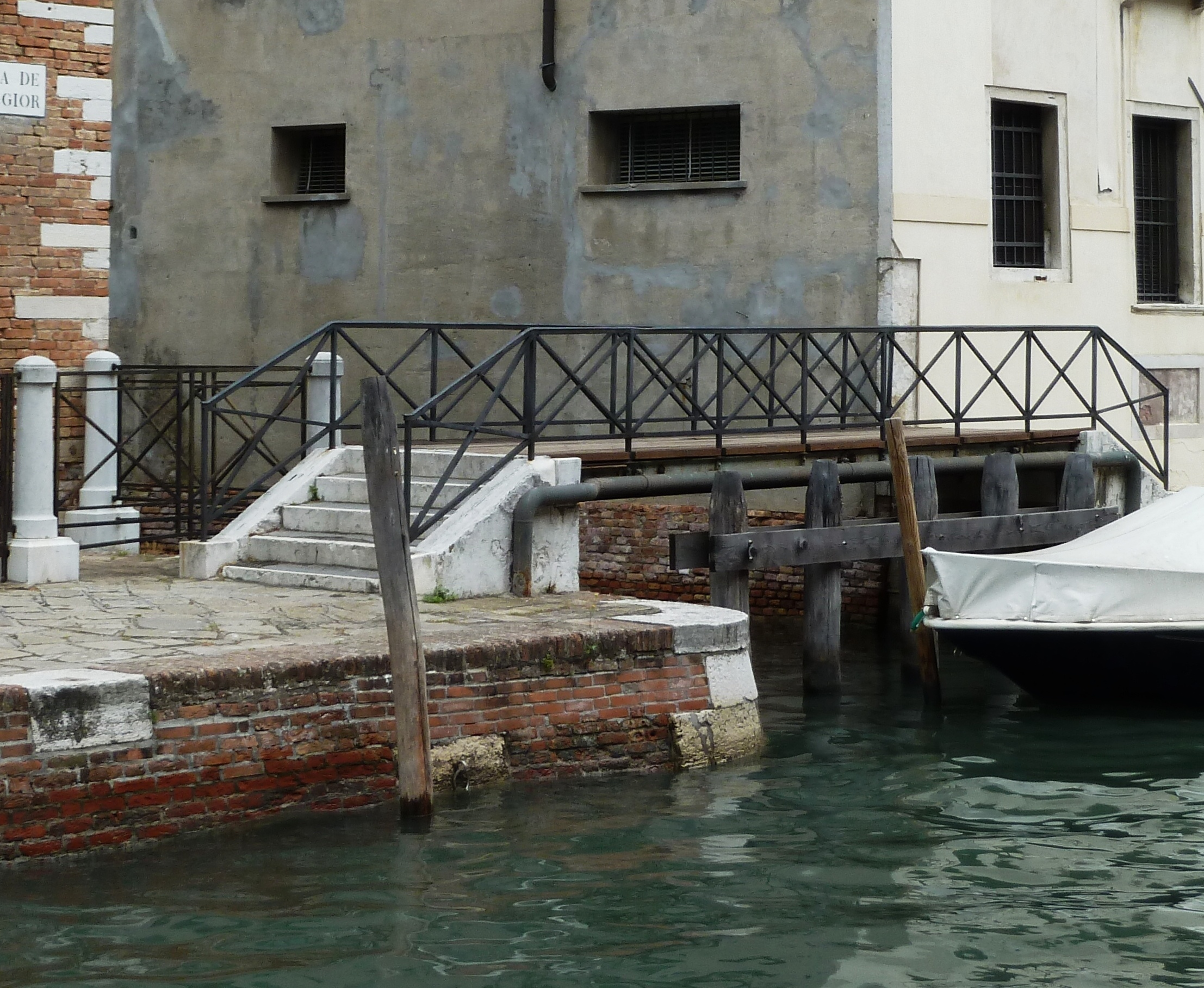
Ponte de Ca' Rizzi
Rio Ca’Rizzi – S.M. Maggiore

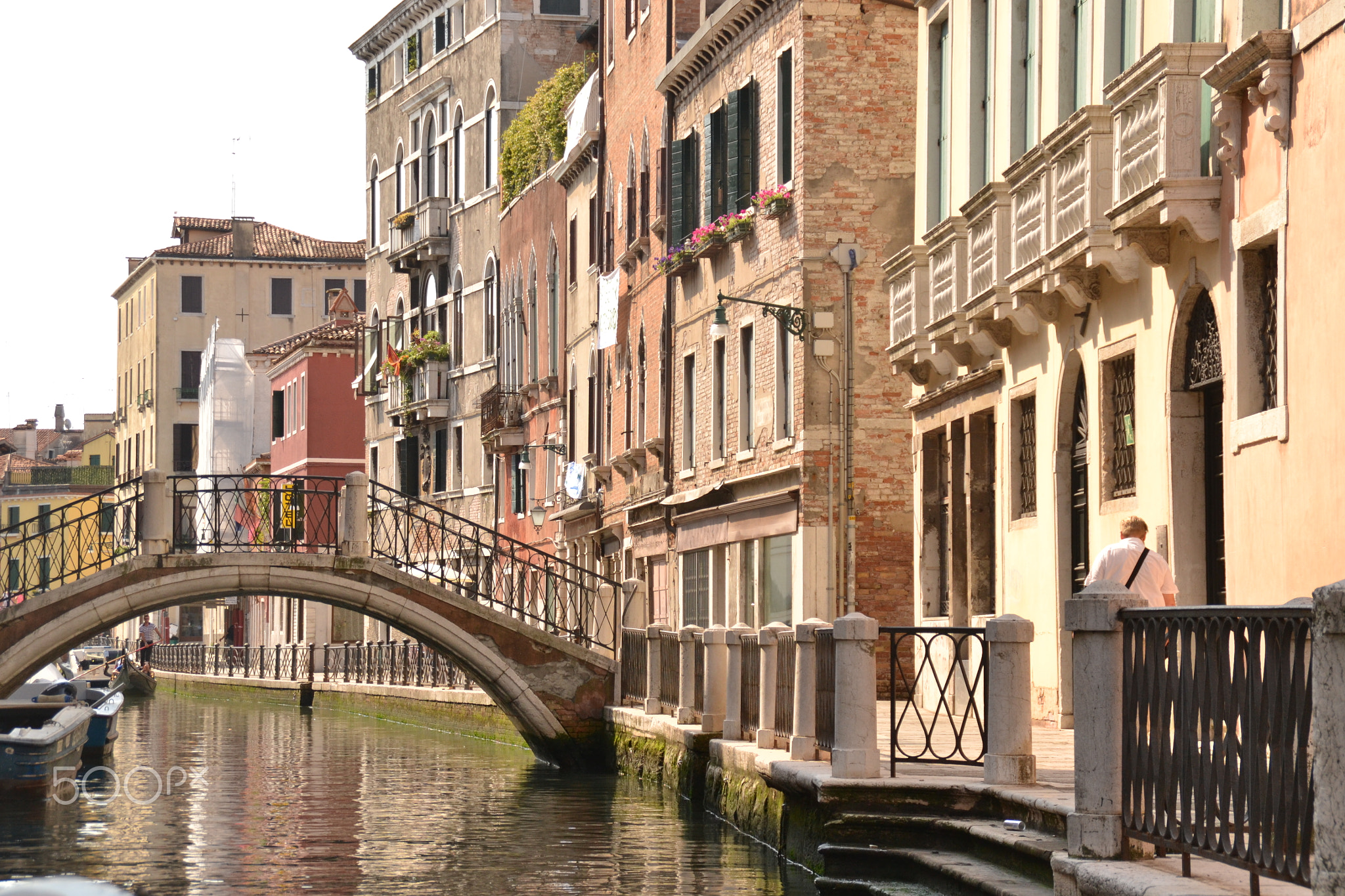
Ponte Cappello/ dei Garzoti
Rio Marin

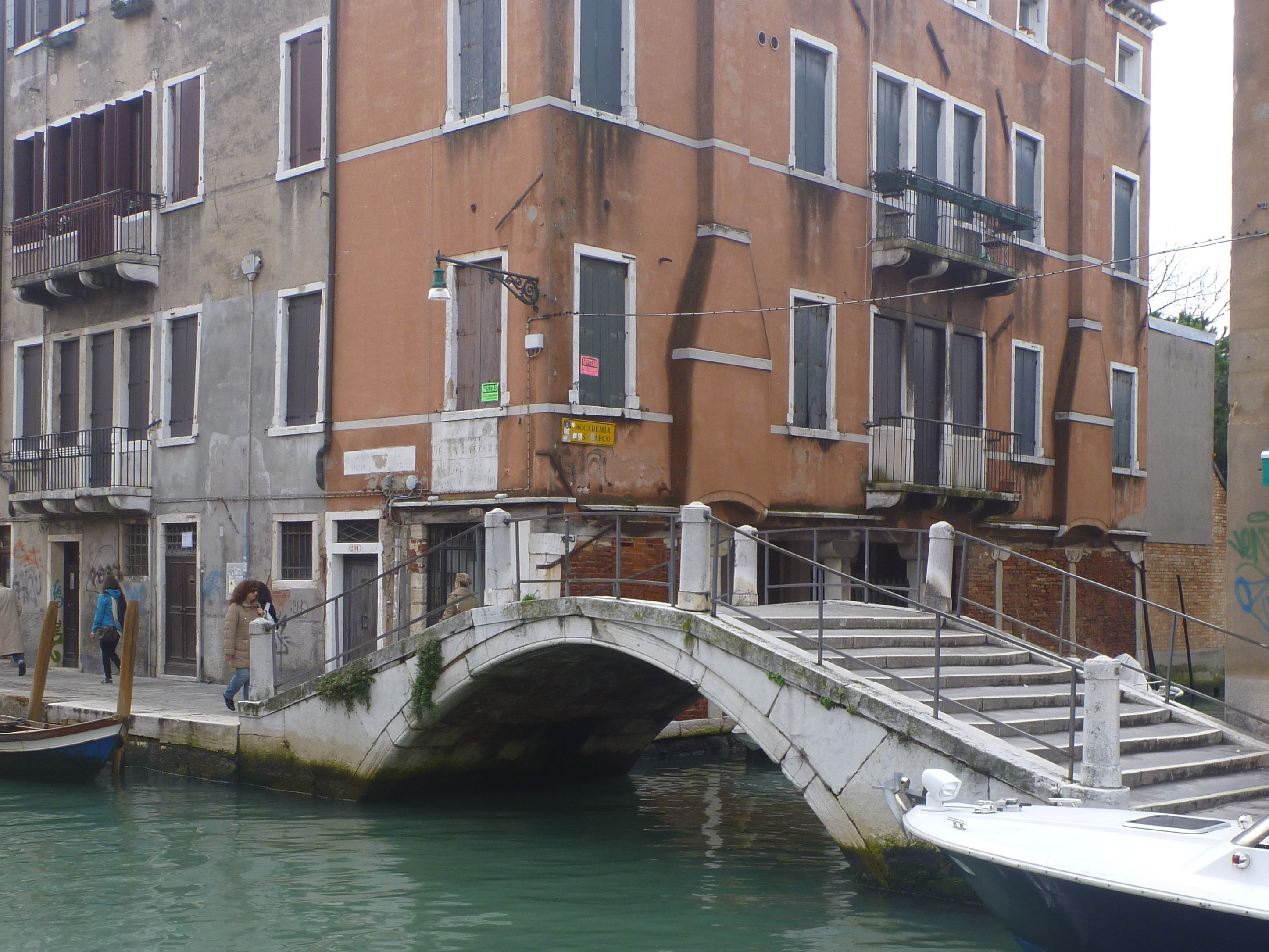
Ponte de la Cazziola
Rio de la Cazziola

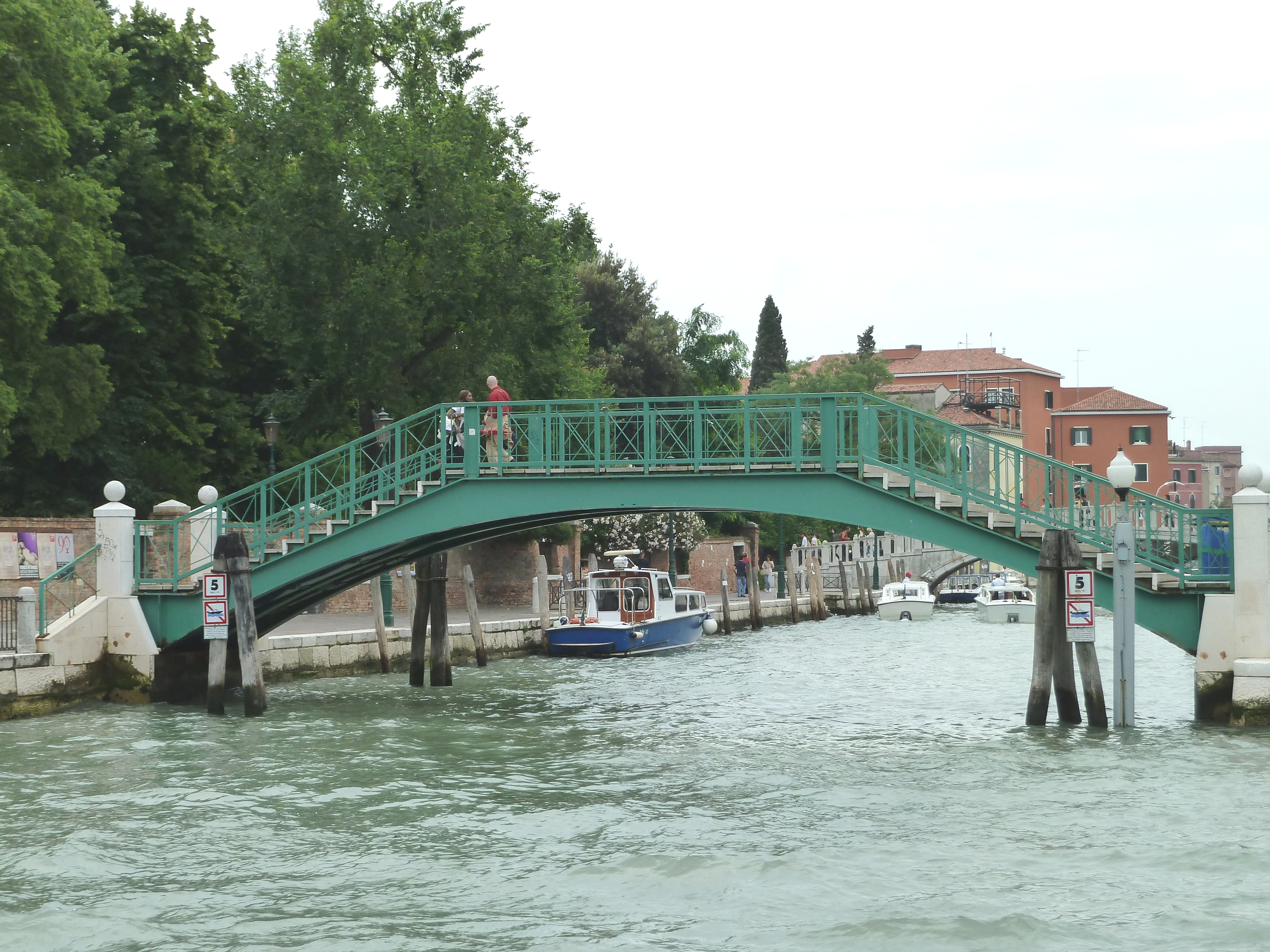
Ponte de Santa Chiara/del Monastero
Rio Novo

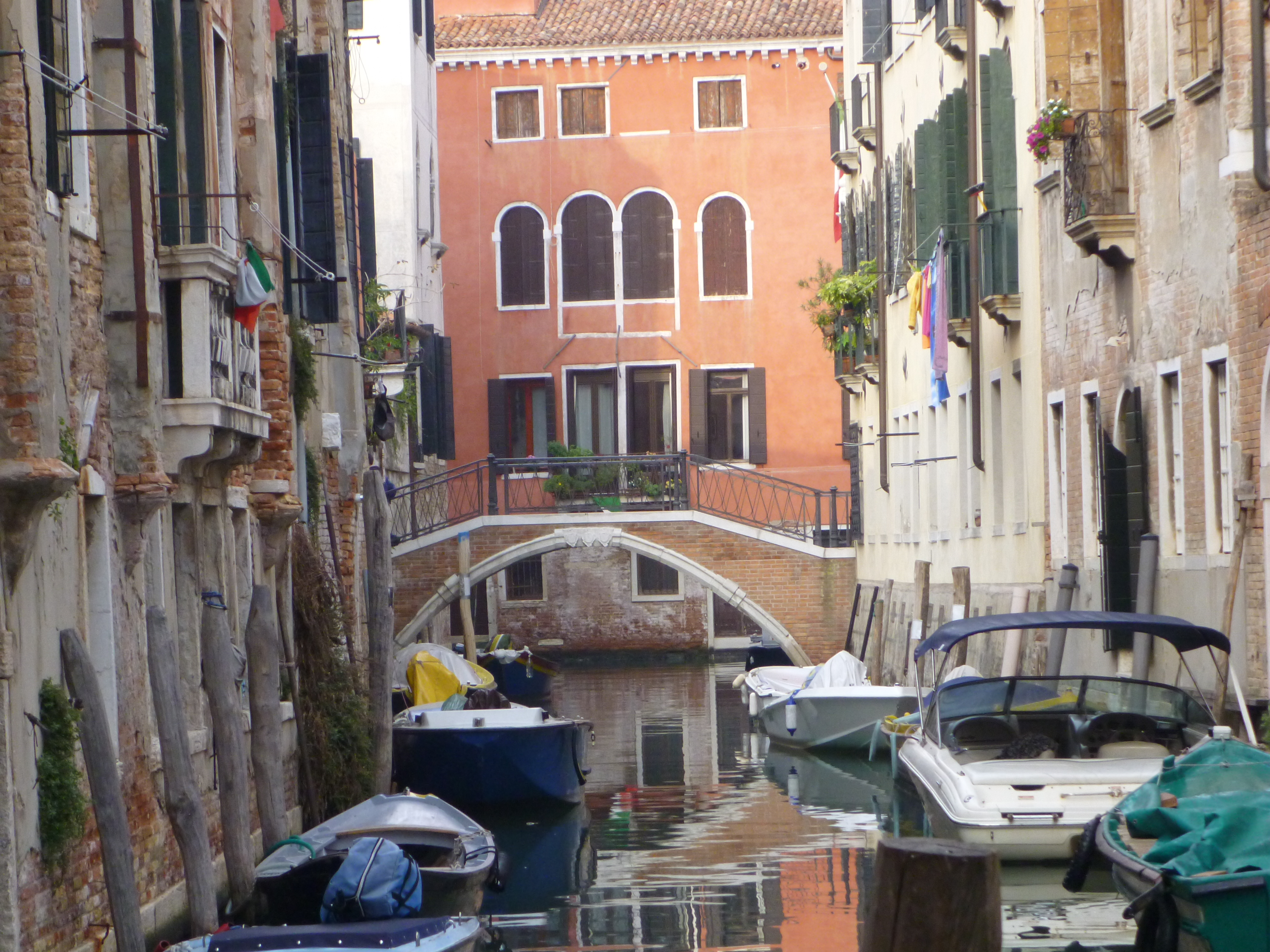
Ponte Colombo ou Carminati
Rio de San Boldo

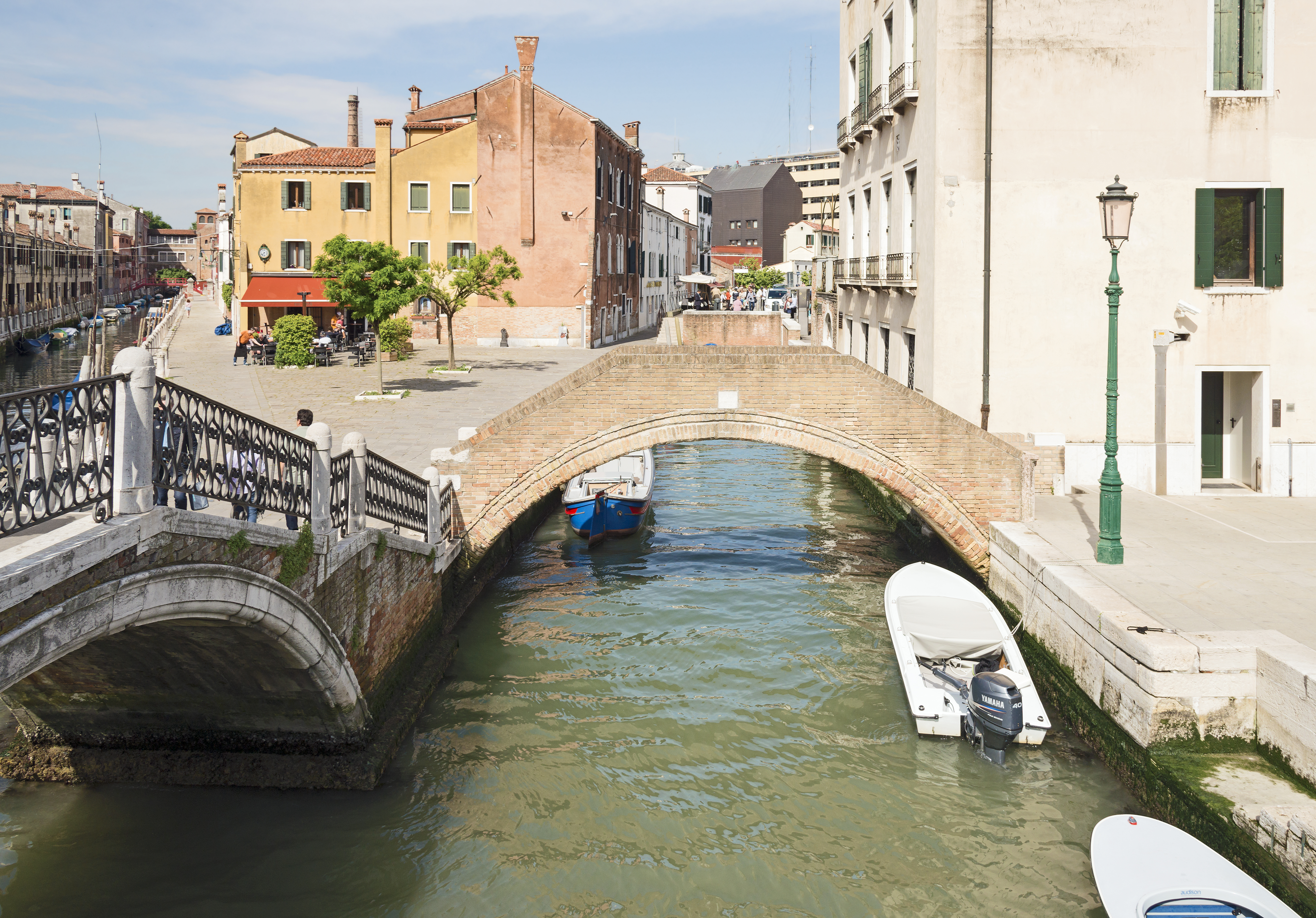
Ponte Cossetti
Rio de Sant'Andrea

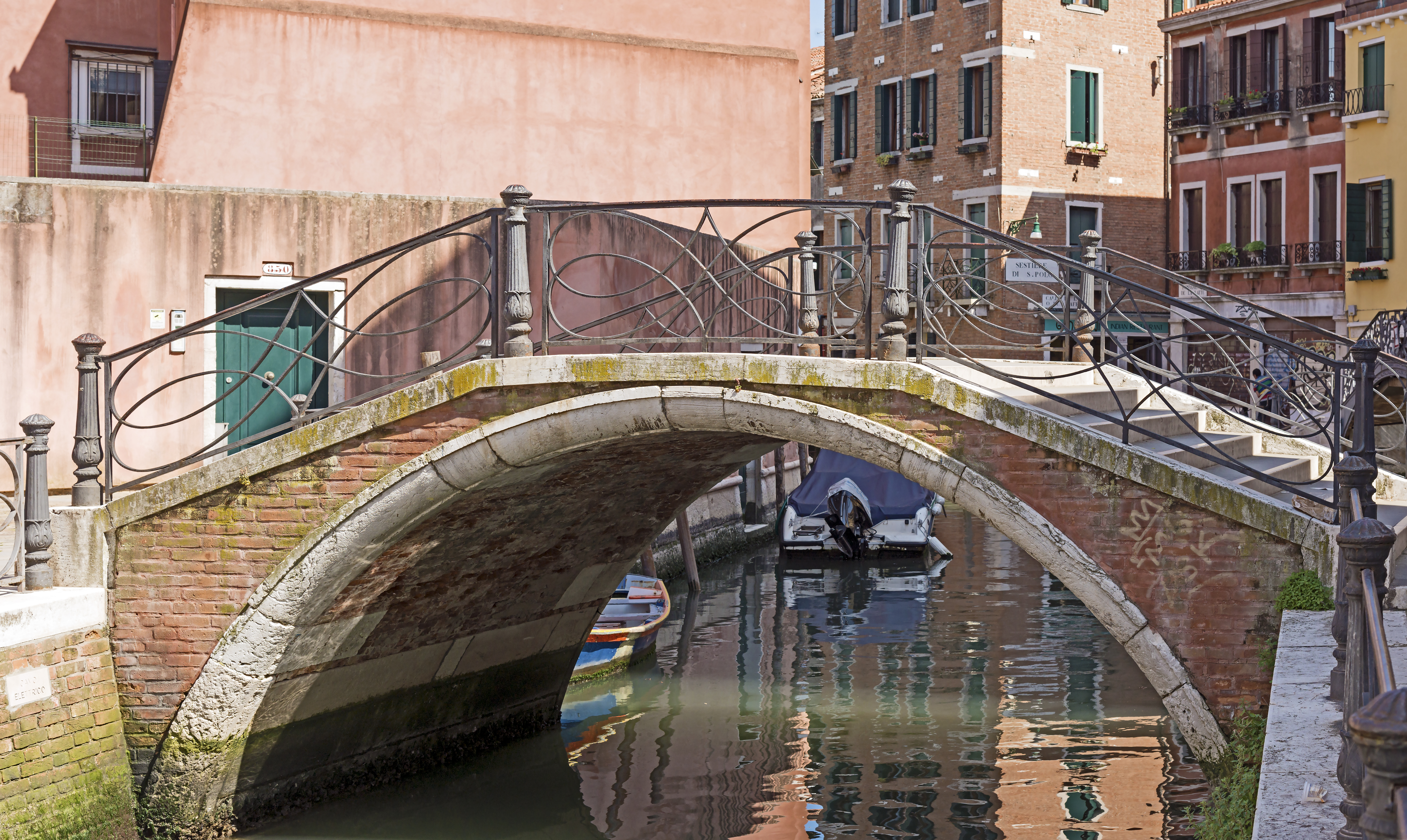
Ponte del Cristo
Rio Marin

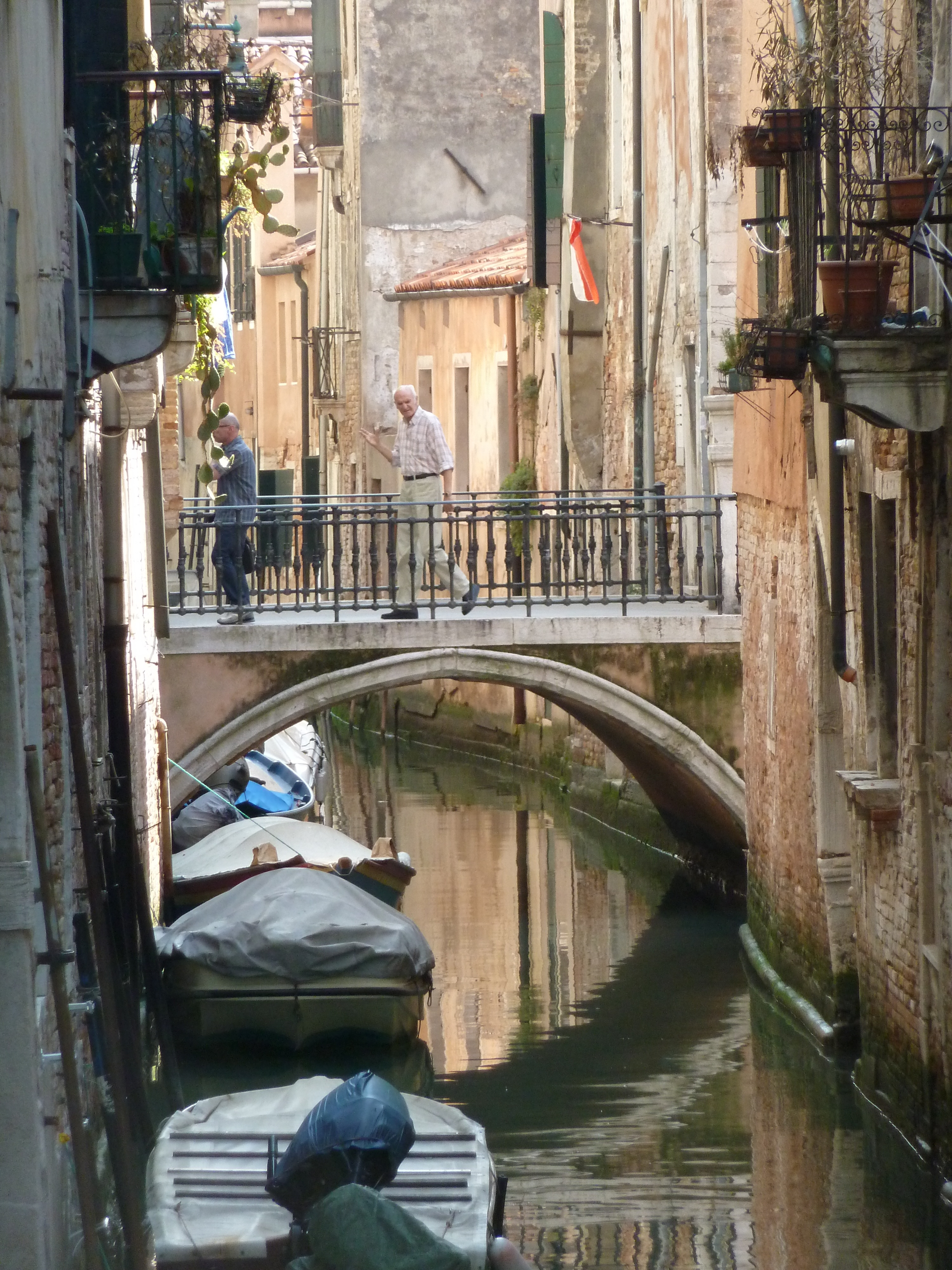
Ponte del Cristo/del Tintor
Rio de la Pergola - Ca' Pesaro

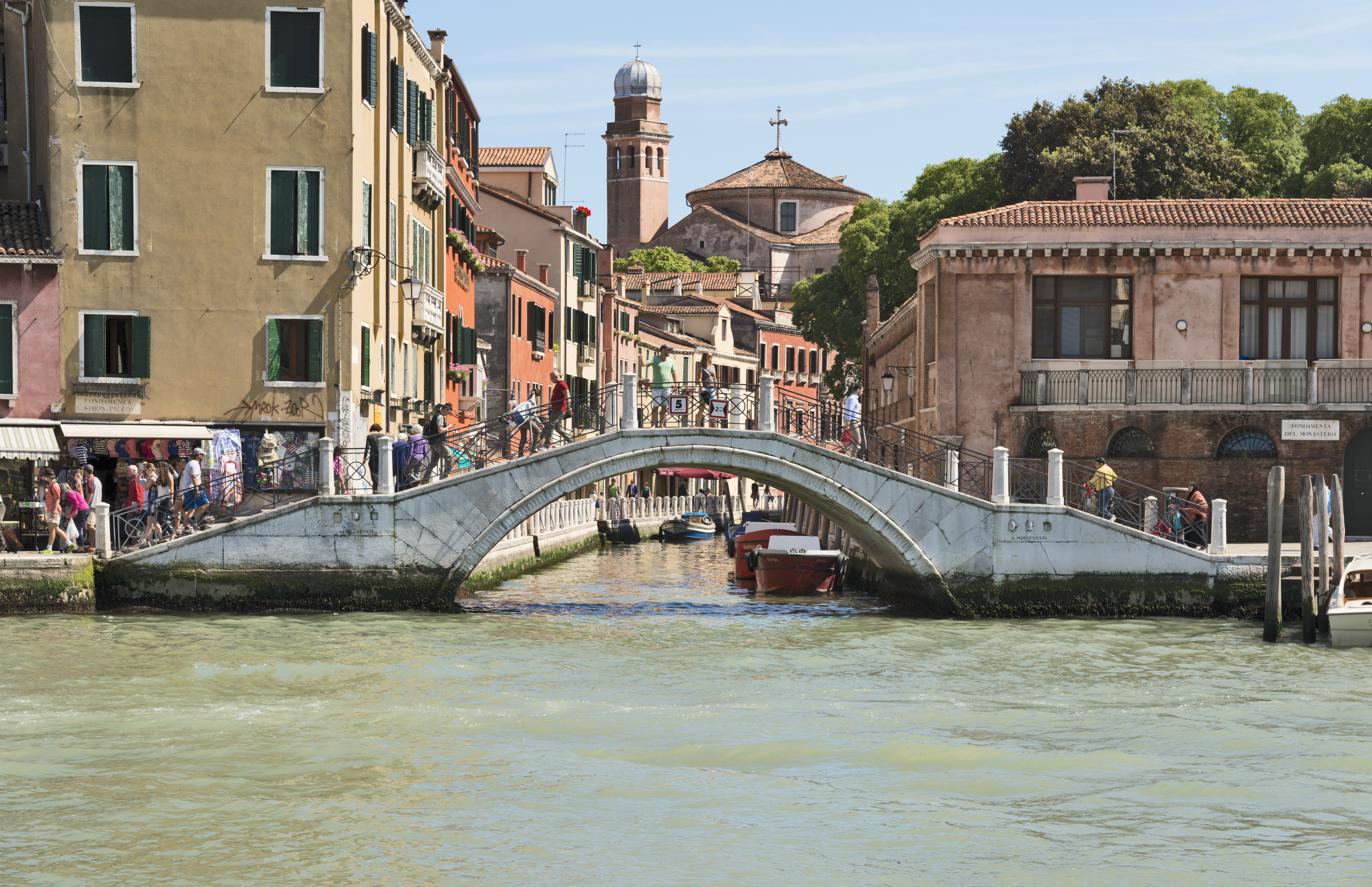
Ponte de la Croze
Rio dei Tolentini

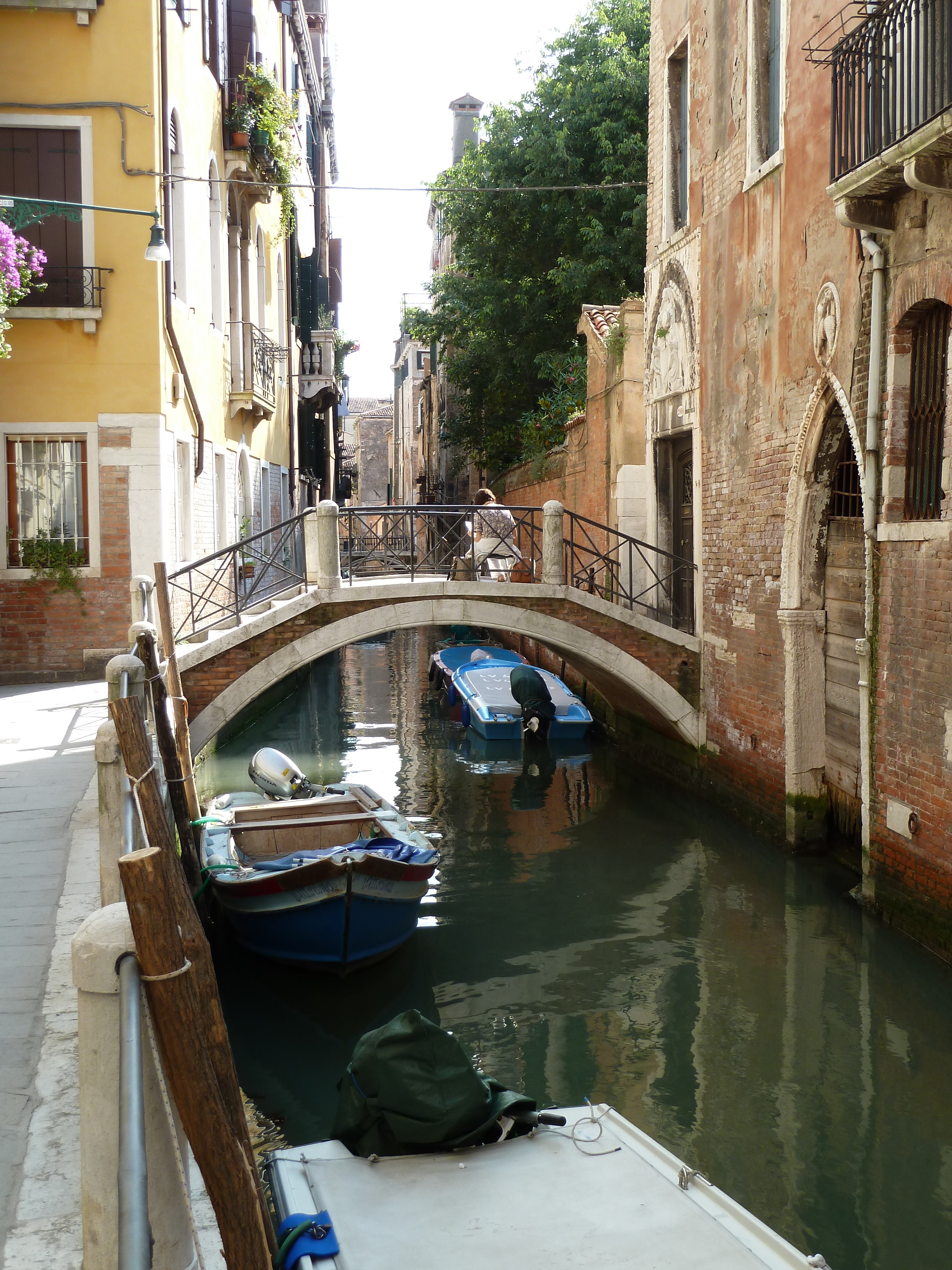
Ponte del Forner
Rio de la Pergola

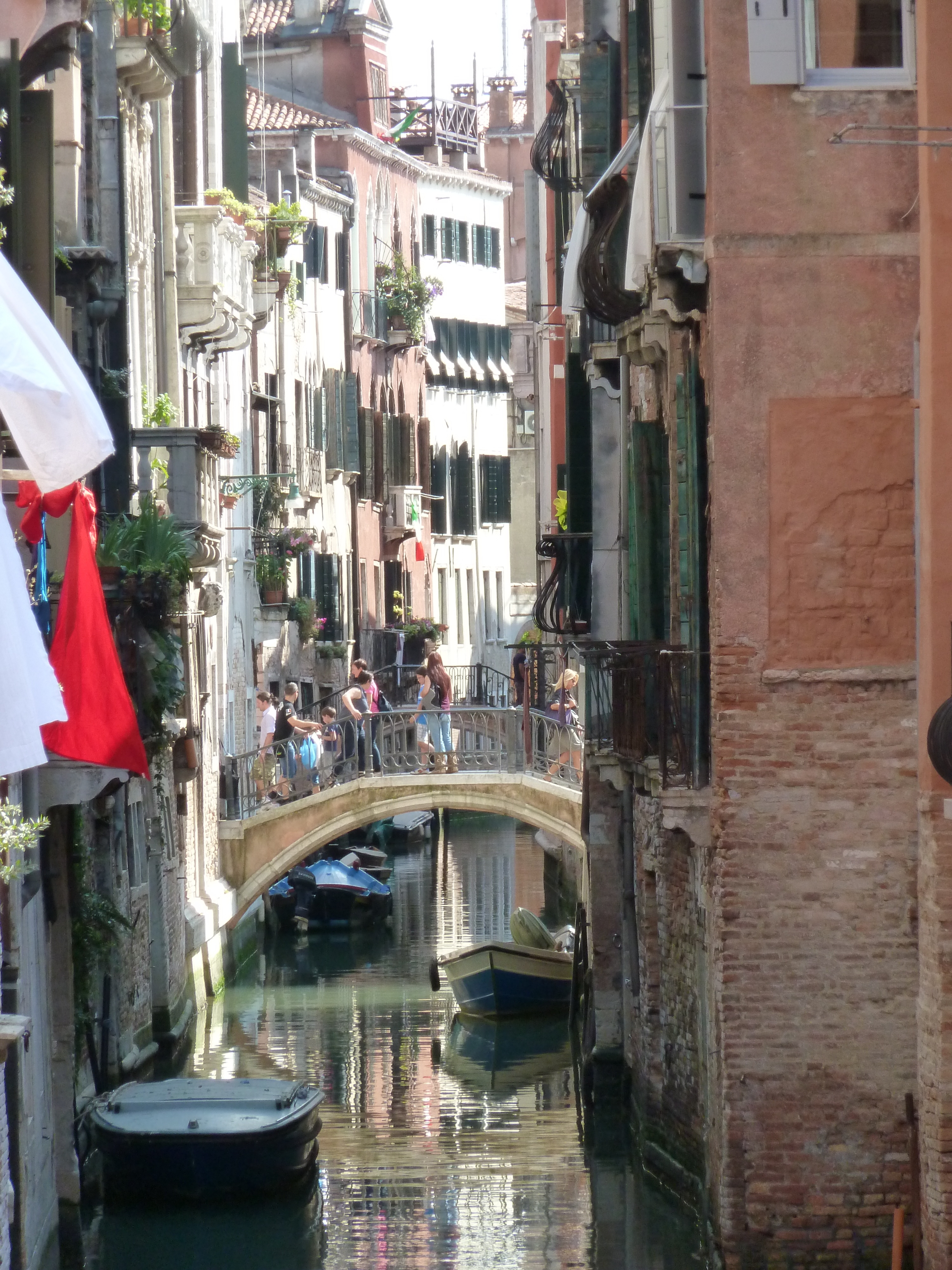
Ponte Santa Maria Mater Domini
Rio de S.M.Mater Domini

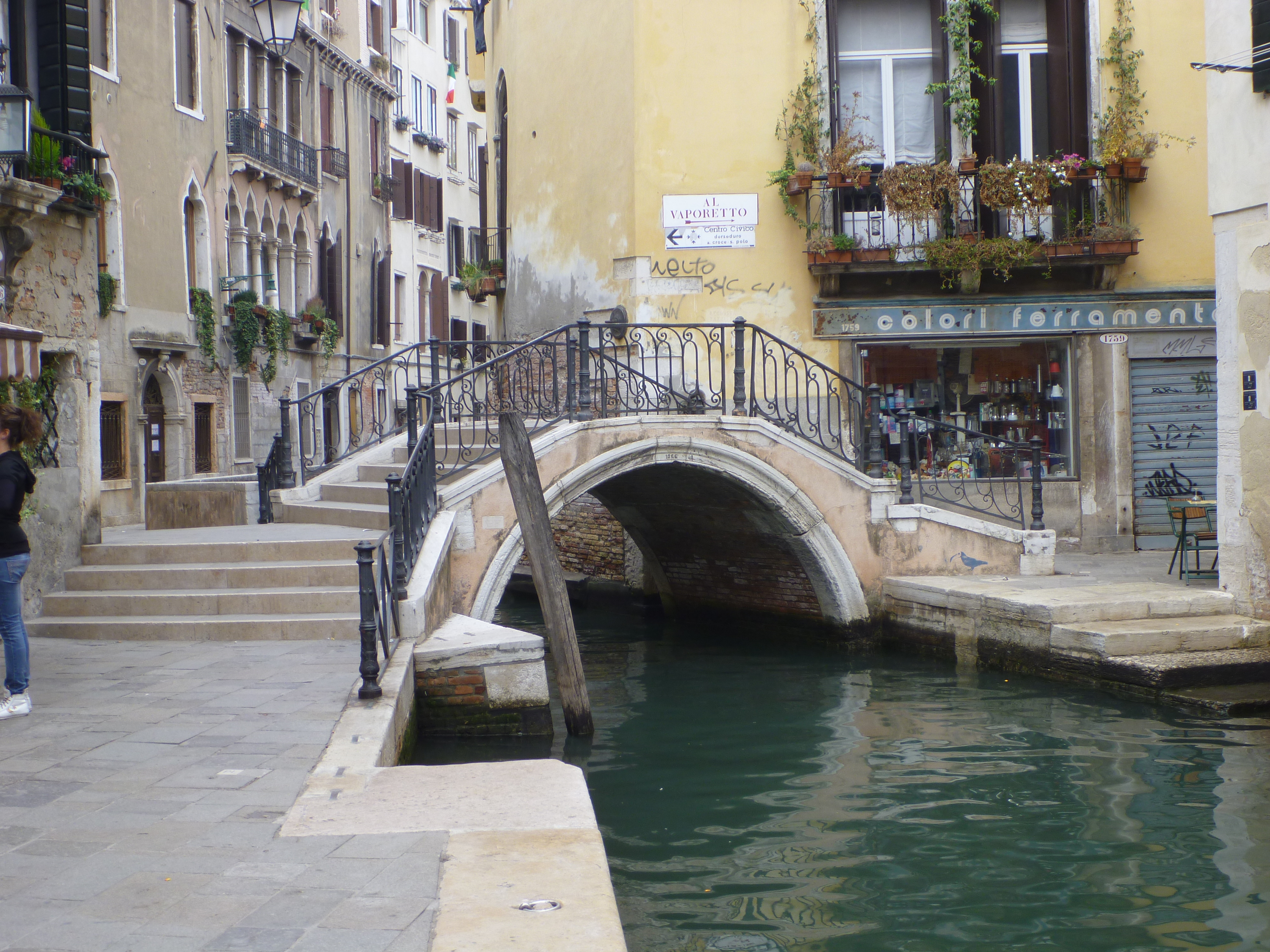
Ponte del Megio
Rio del Megio

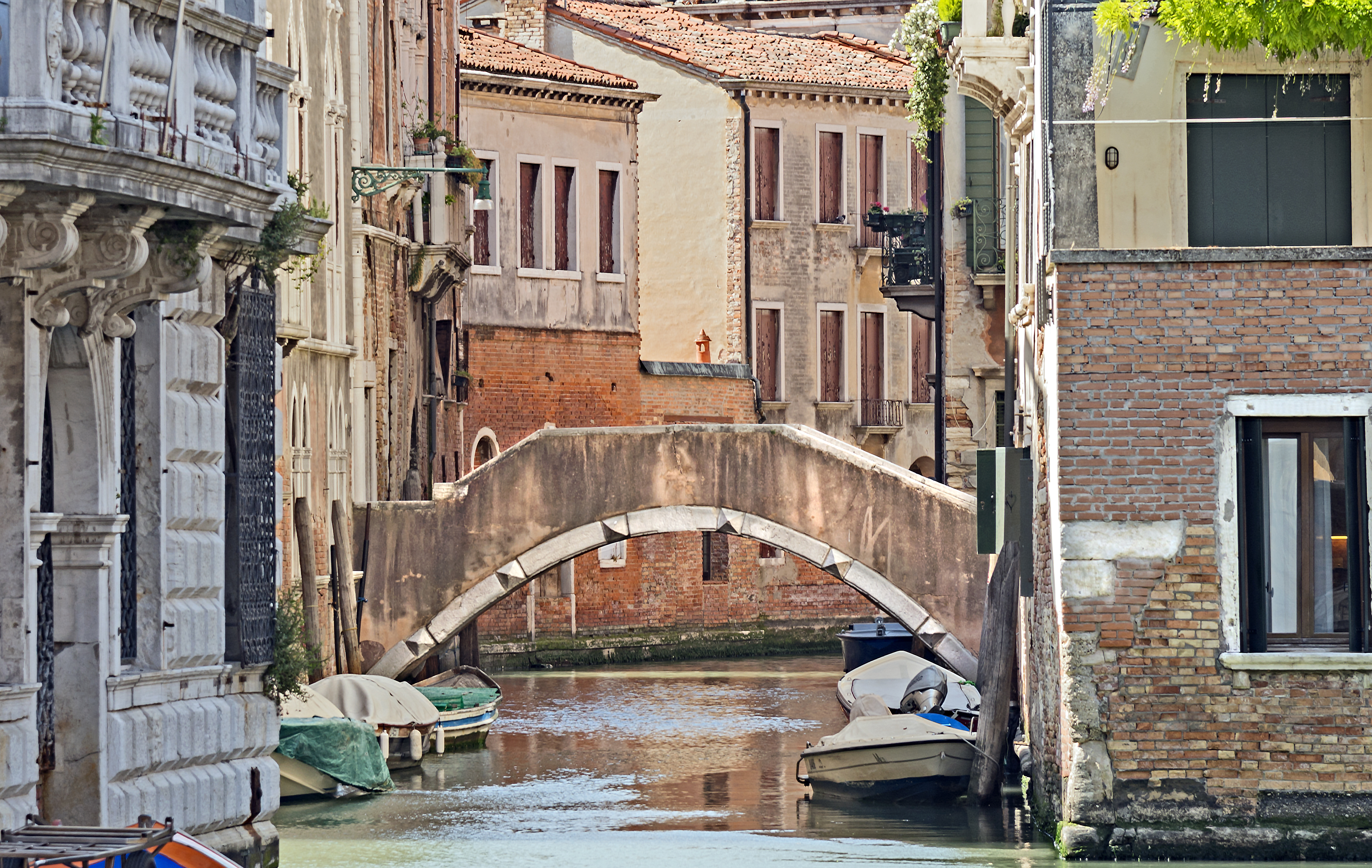
Ponte de le Oche
Rio de San Zan Degolà

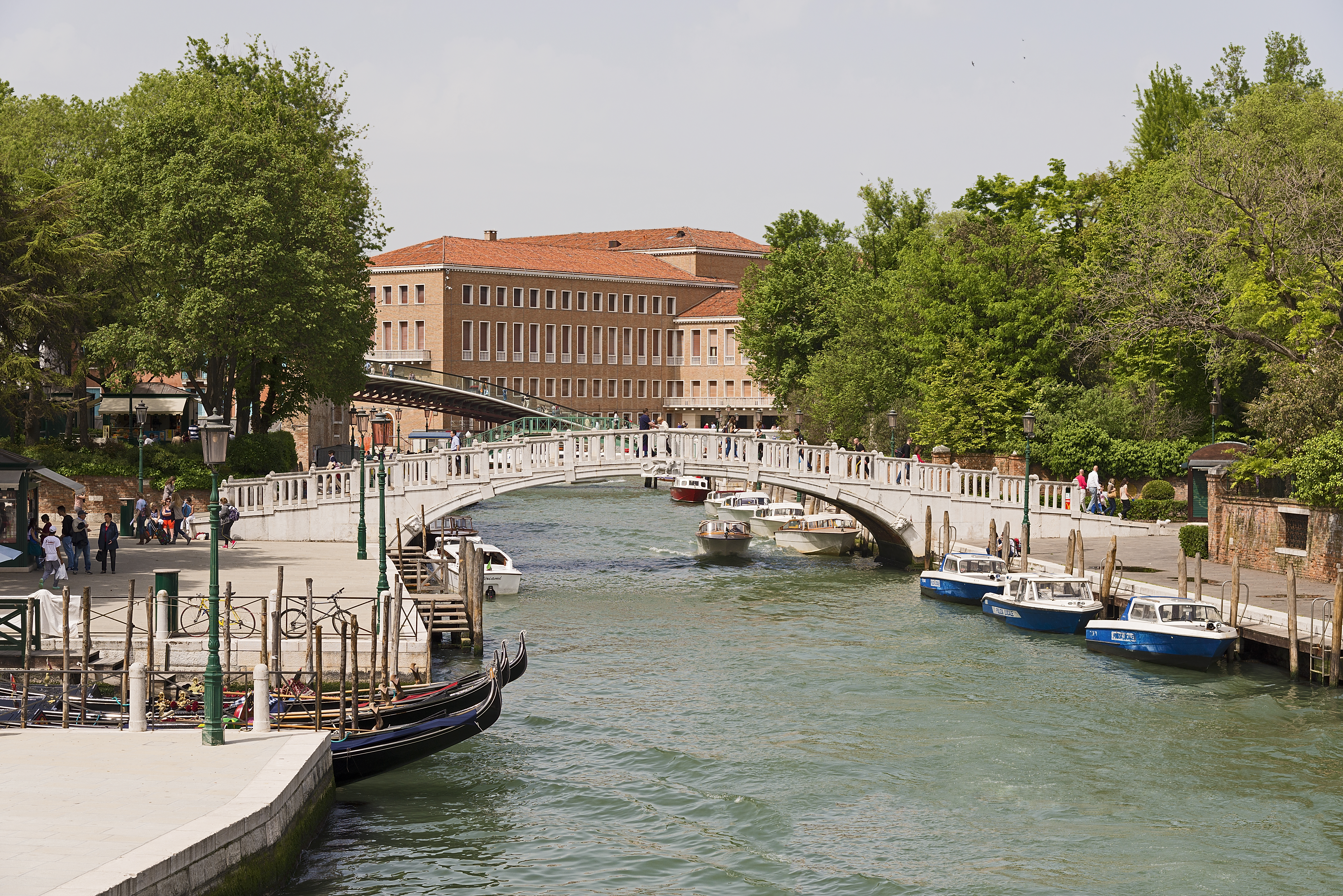
Ponte del Prefetto/Papadopoli
Rio Novo

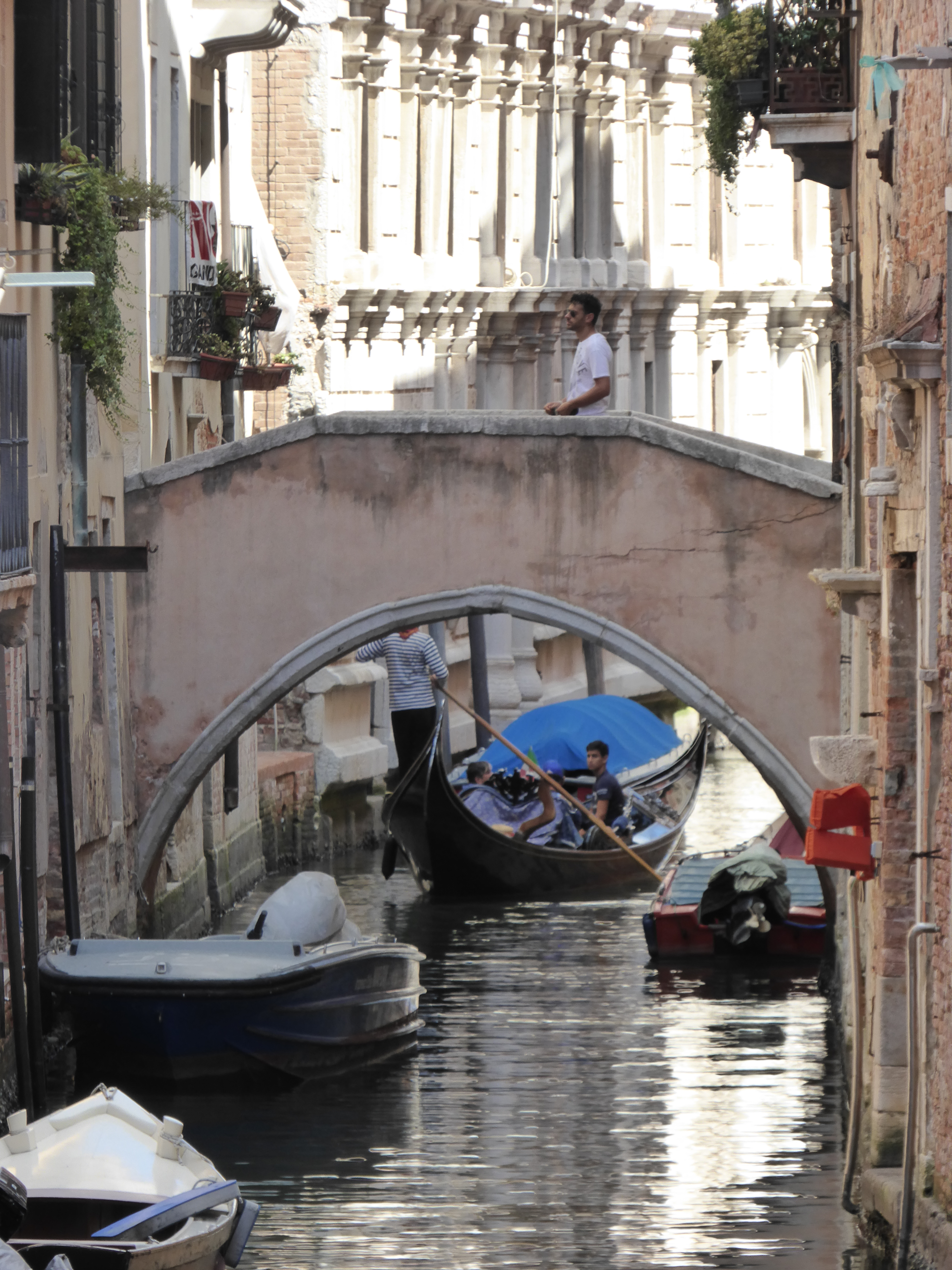
Ponte del Ravano
Rio de le do Torre

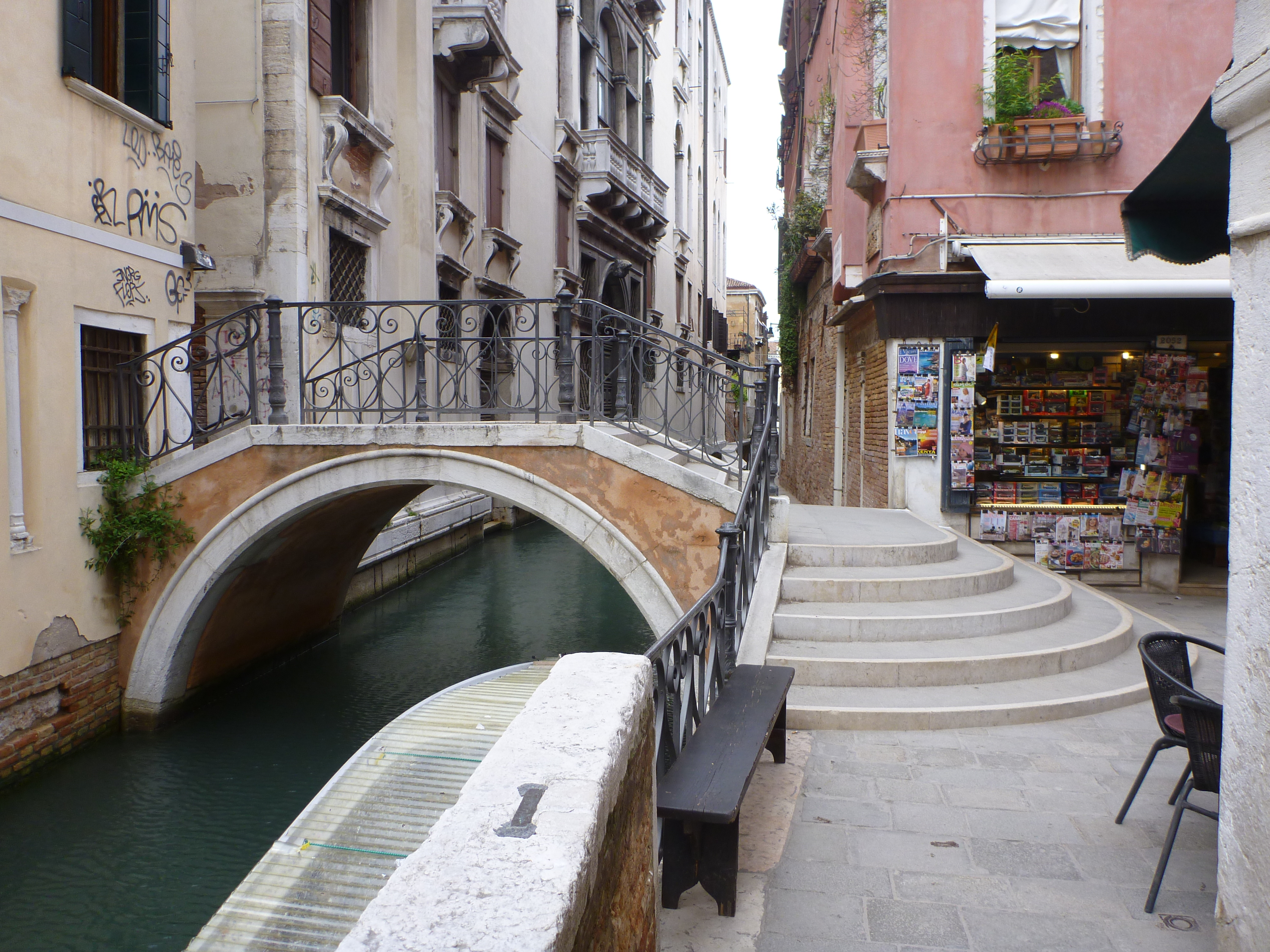
Ponte de la Rioda
Rio de San Stae

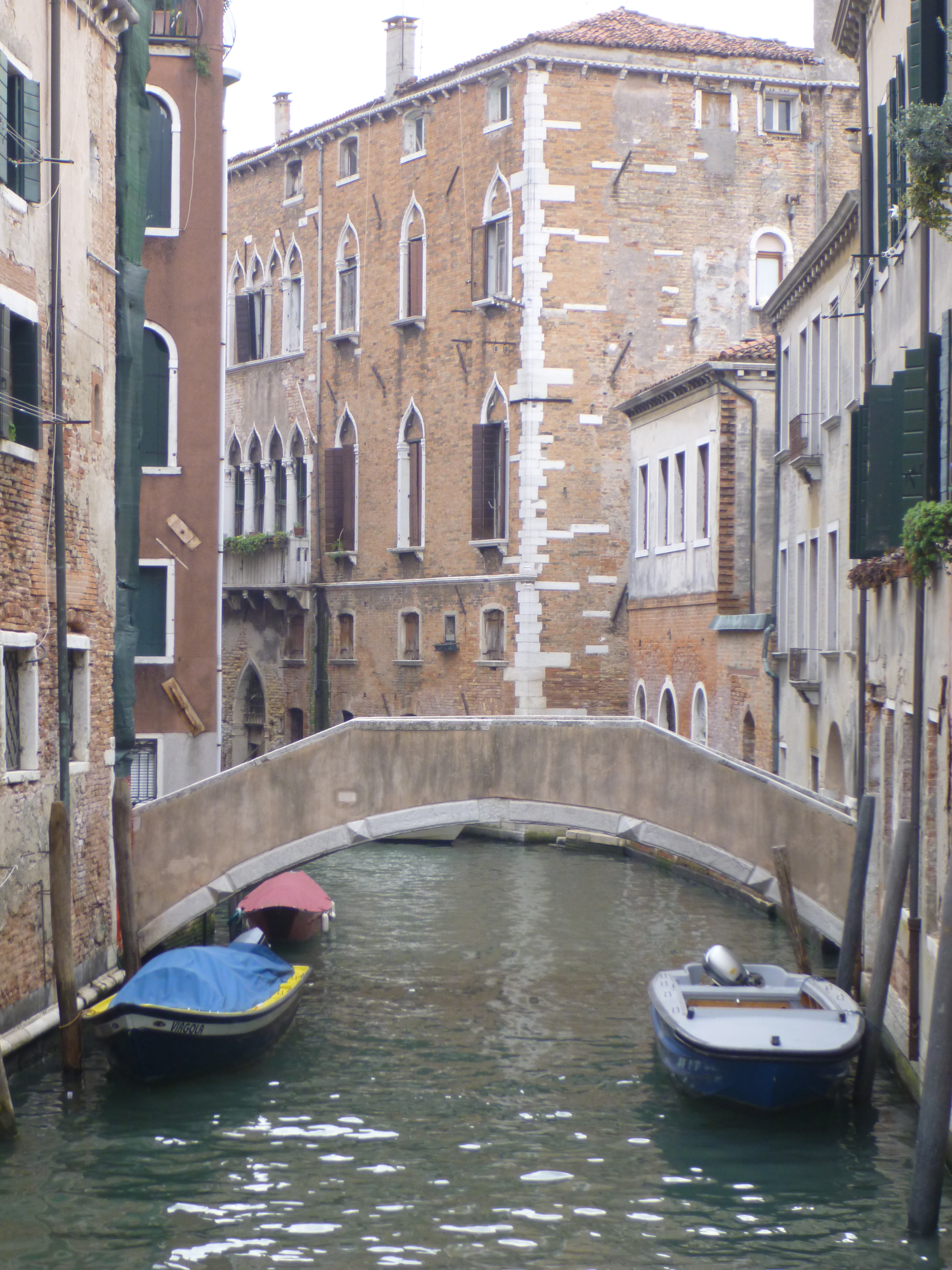
Ponte de Ruga Bella ou del Forner
Rio de San Zan Degolà

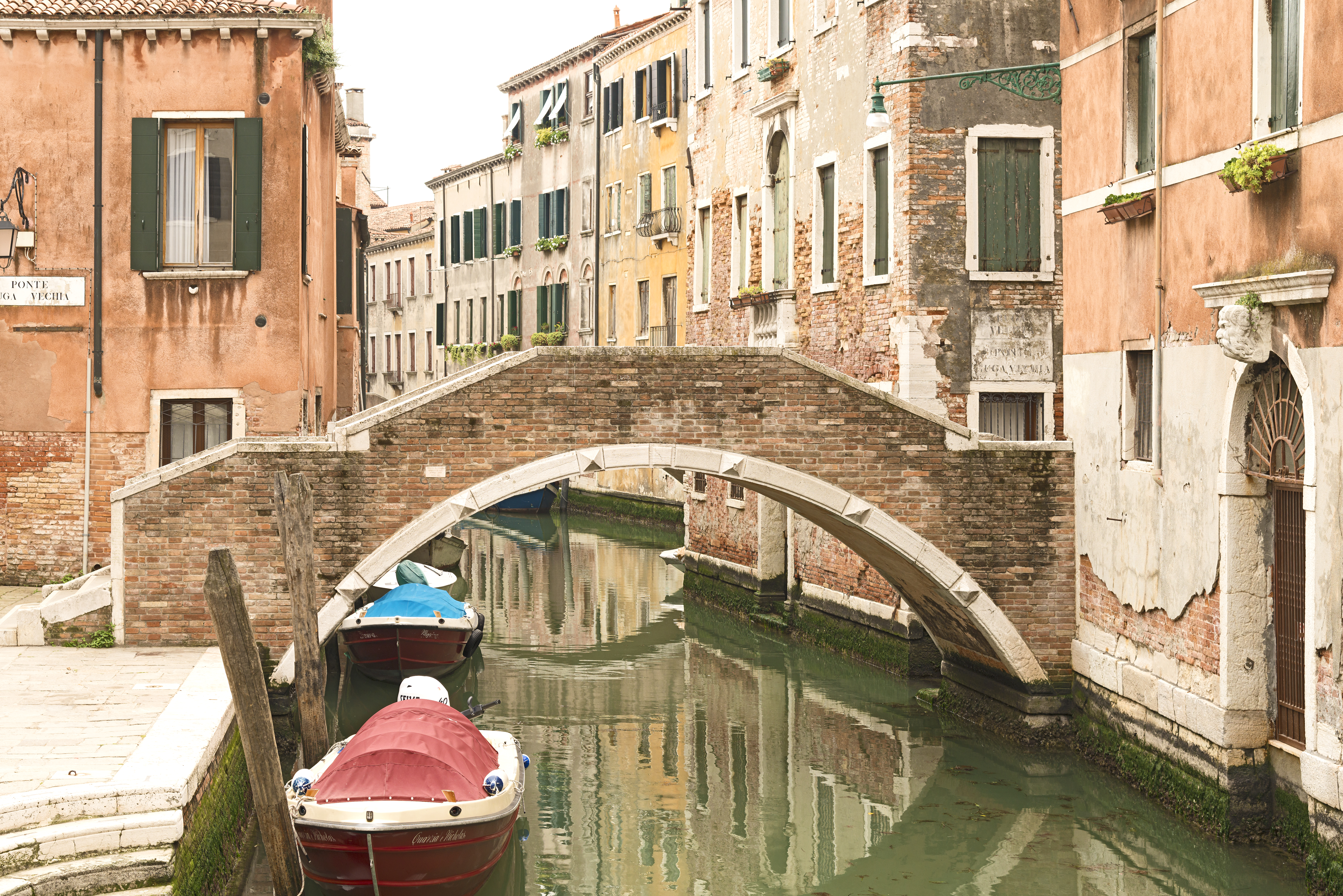
Ponte de Ruga Vecchia
Rio de San Zan Degolà

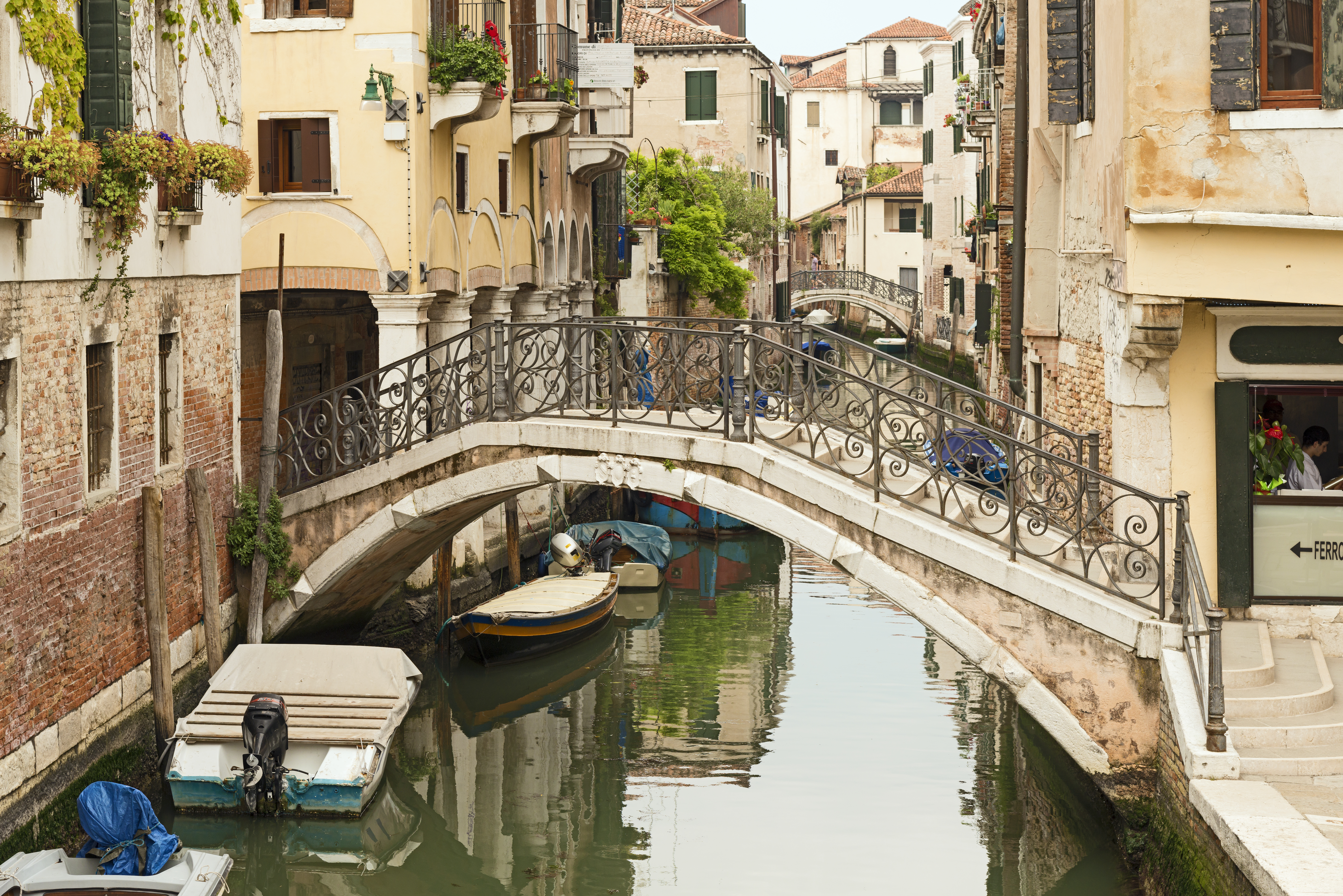
Ponte del Savio ou Storto
Rio de San Zan Degolà

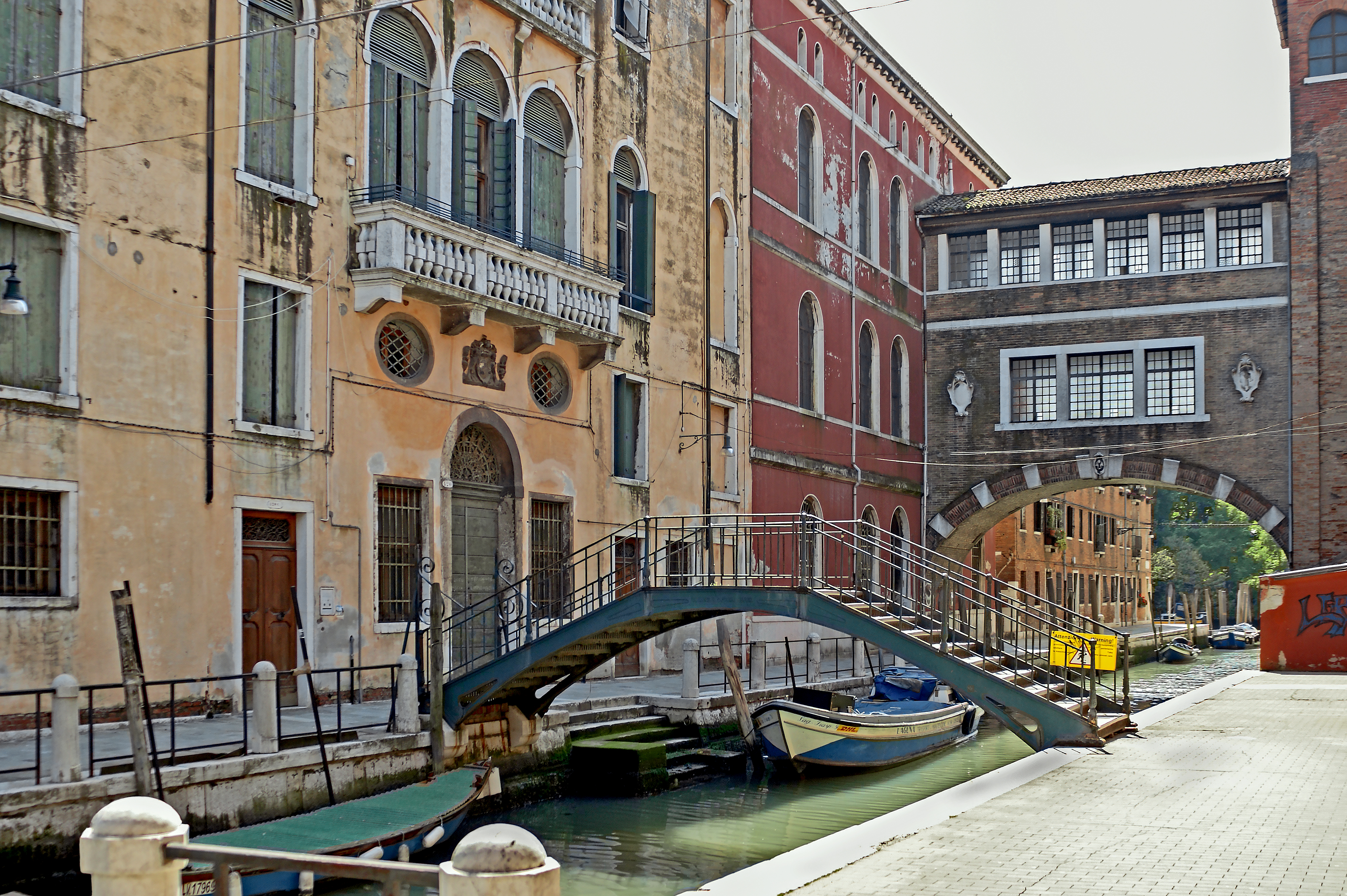
Ponte dei Tabacchi ou delle Burchielle
Rio de le Burchiele

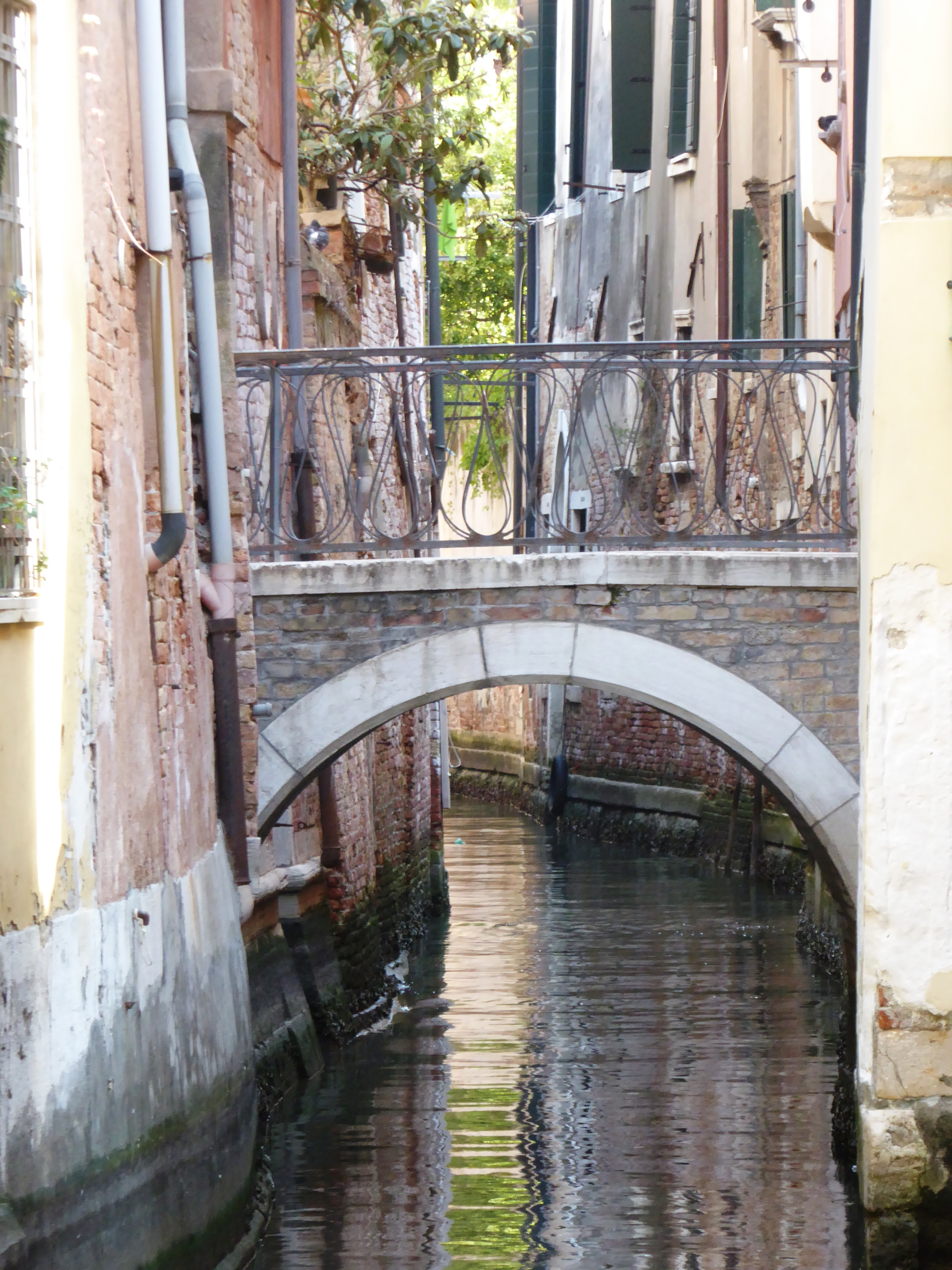
Ponte del Tentor
Rio de Ca' Tron

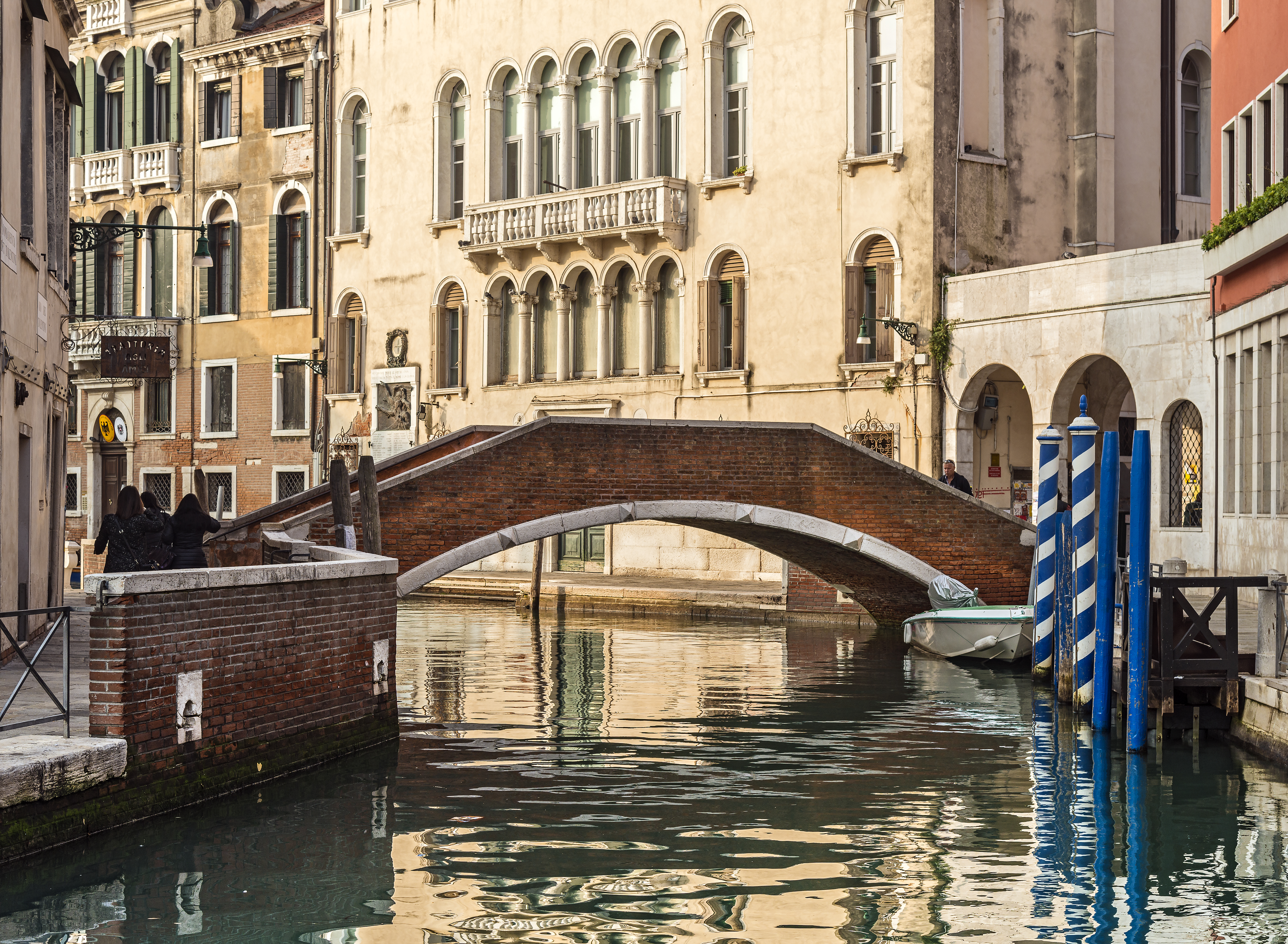
Ponte dei Tolentini
Rio dei Tolentini
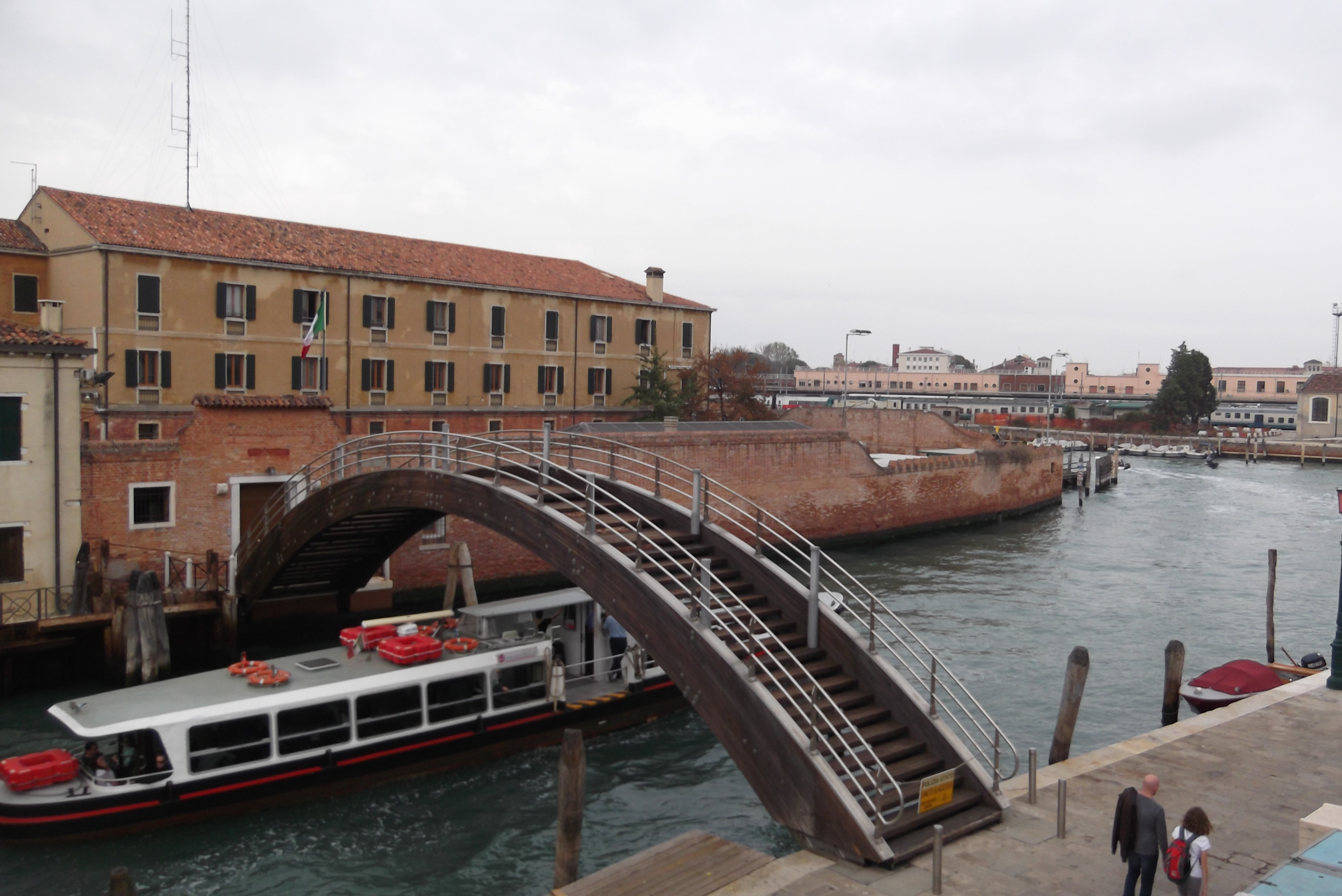
private bridge of the Questura
Canal de Santa Chiara

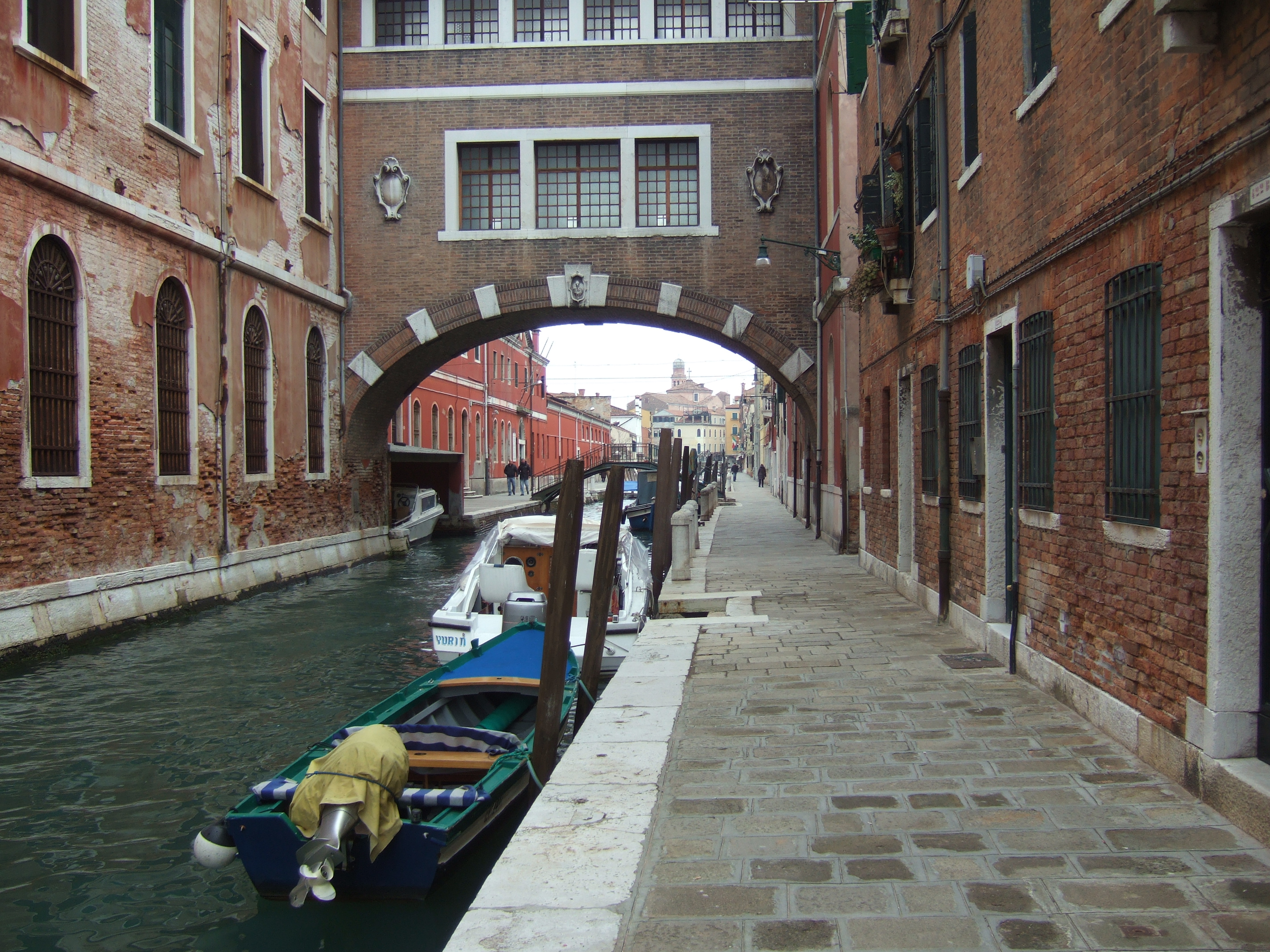
private bridge of the fabbrica dei tabacchi
Rio de le Burchiele

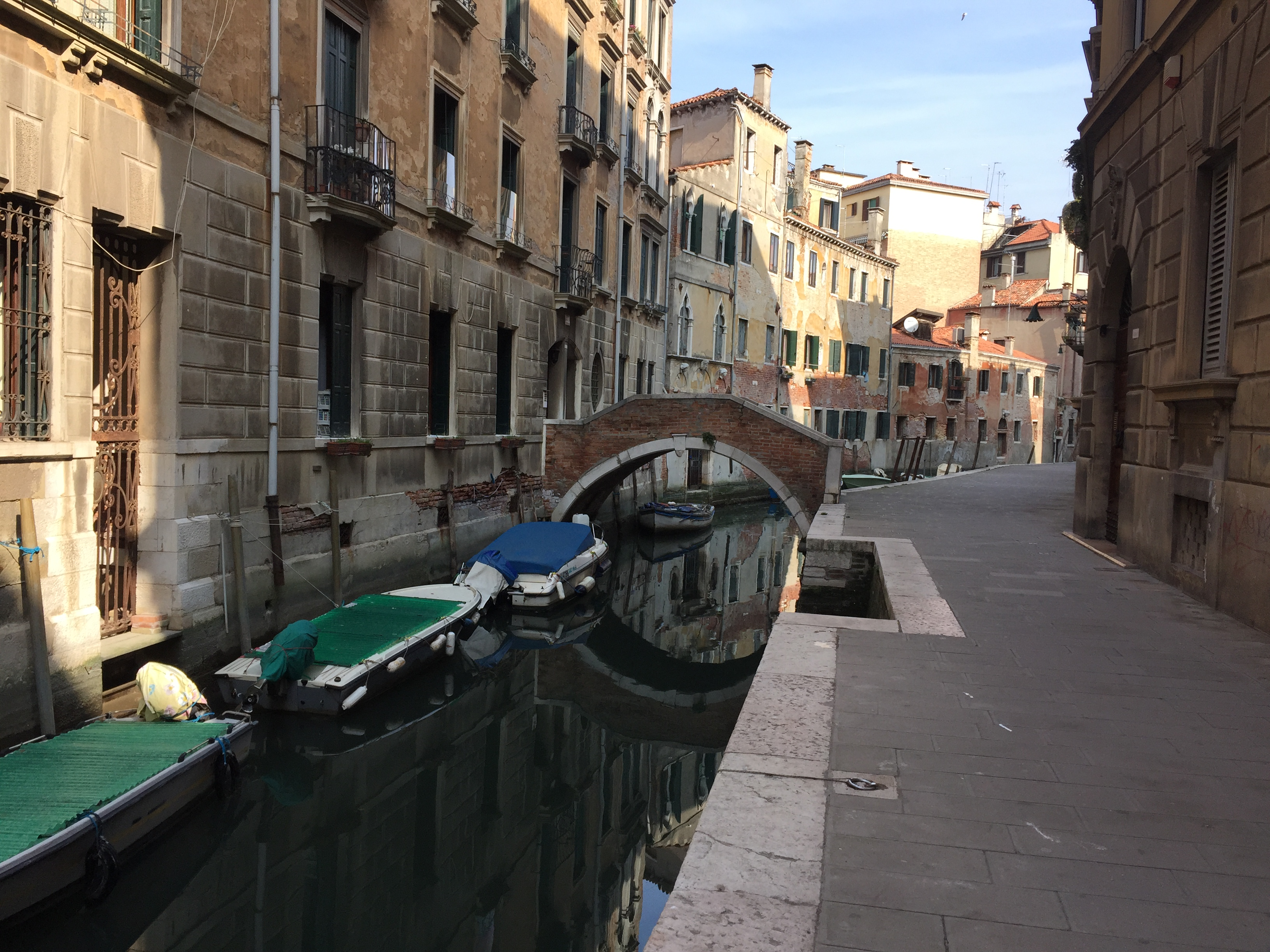
private bridge (No. 197/A), Rio de le Muneghete

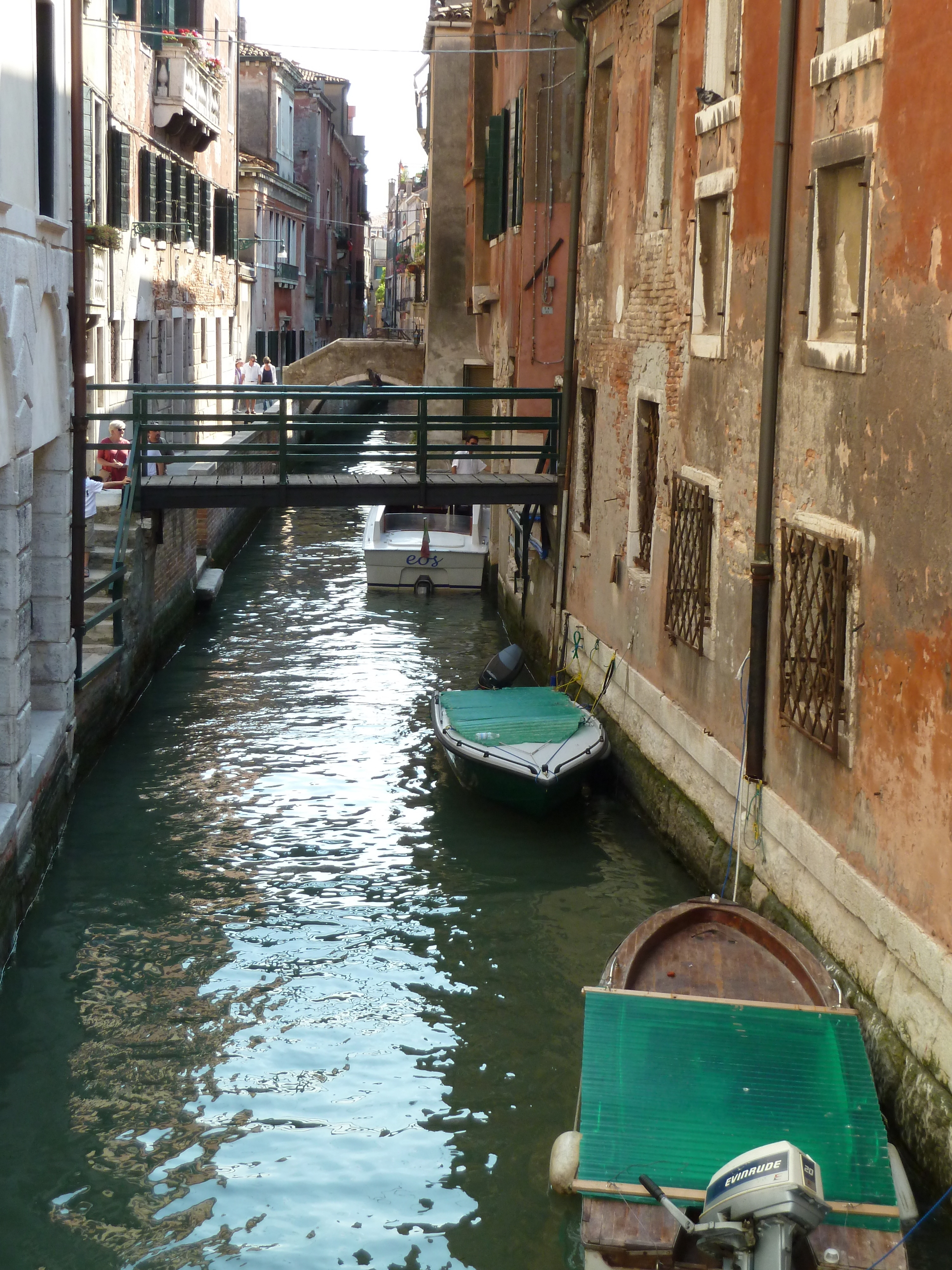
private bridge (No. 2069) Rio de San Stae

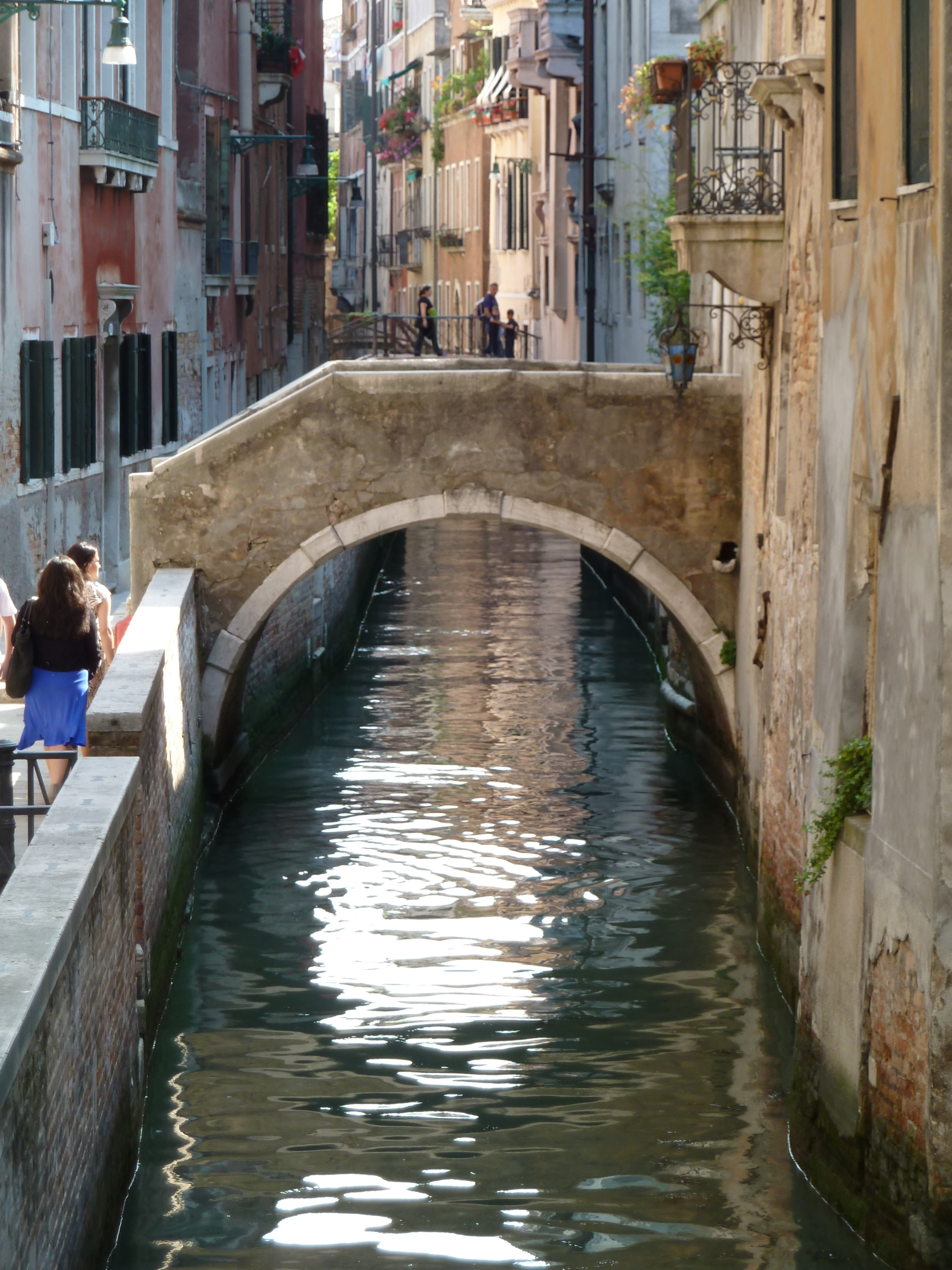
private bridge Ponte de Ca' Mocenigo Rio de San Stae

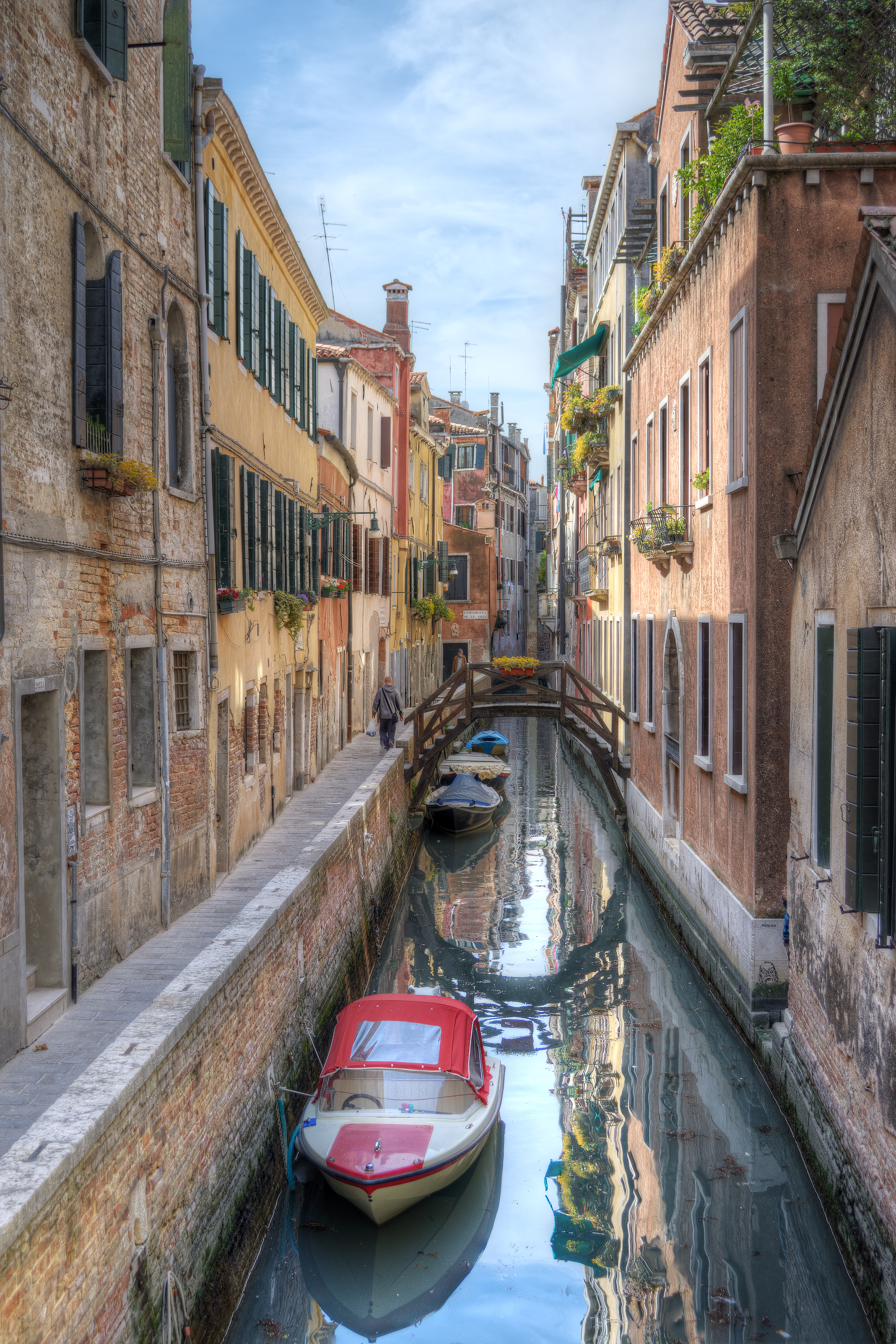
private bridge Fdta de le Grue
Rio de San Stae

=== Border Santa Croce-Dorsoduro ===
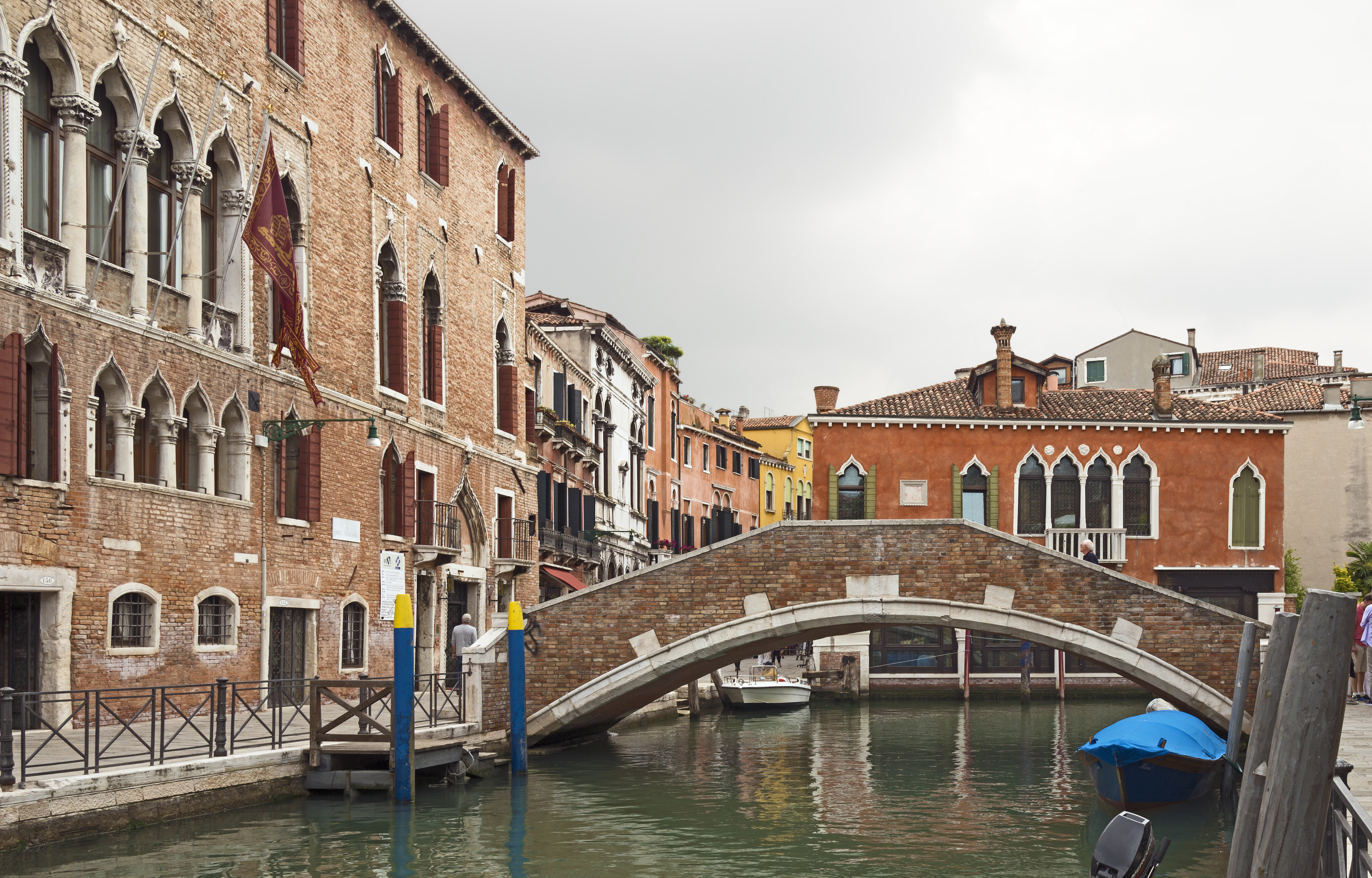
Ponte de Ca' Marcello
Rio del Gaffaro

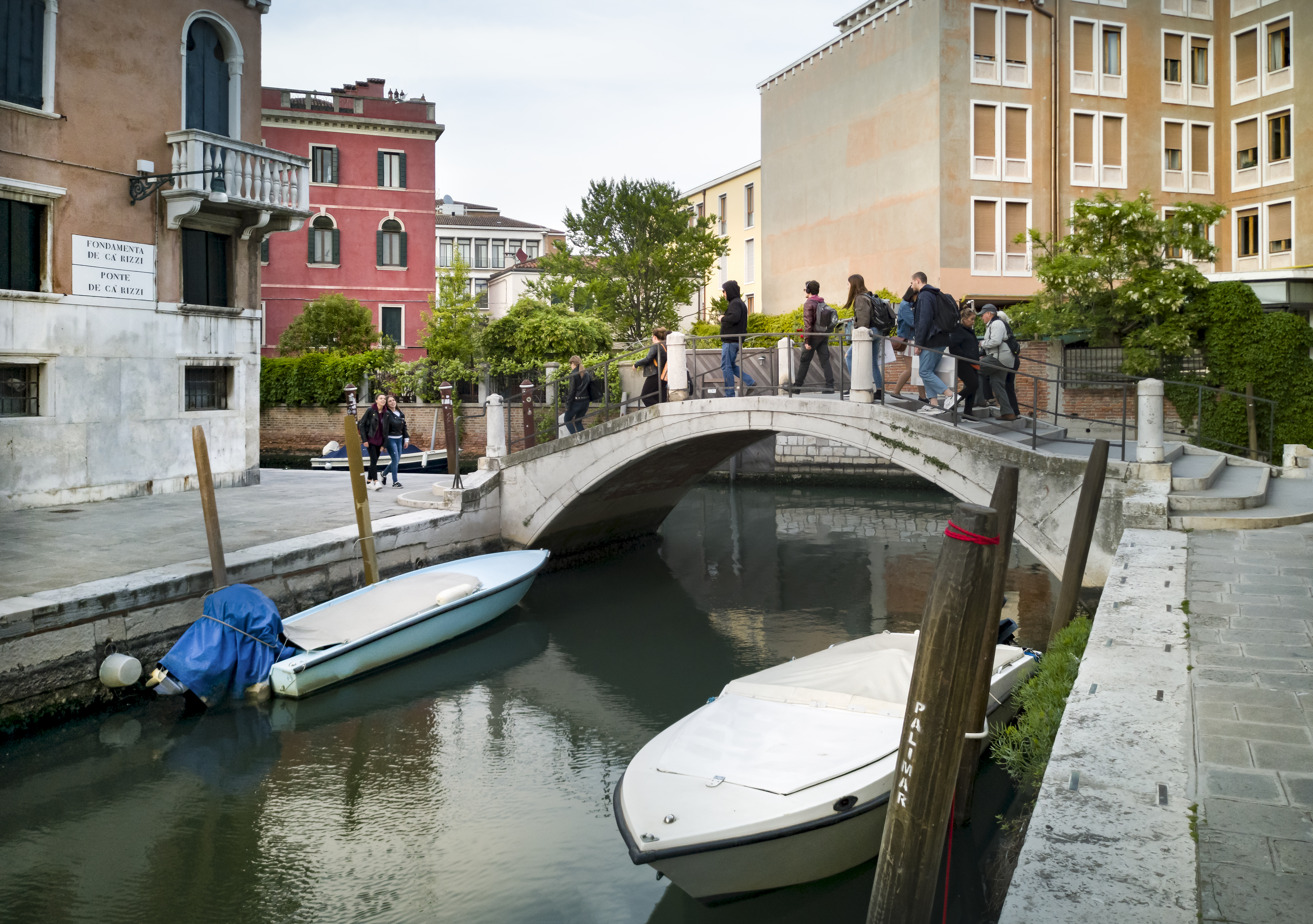
Ponte da Ca' Rizzi
Rio di Santa Maria Maggiore

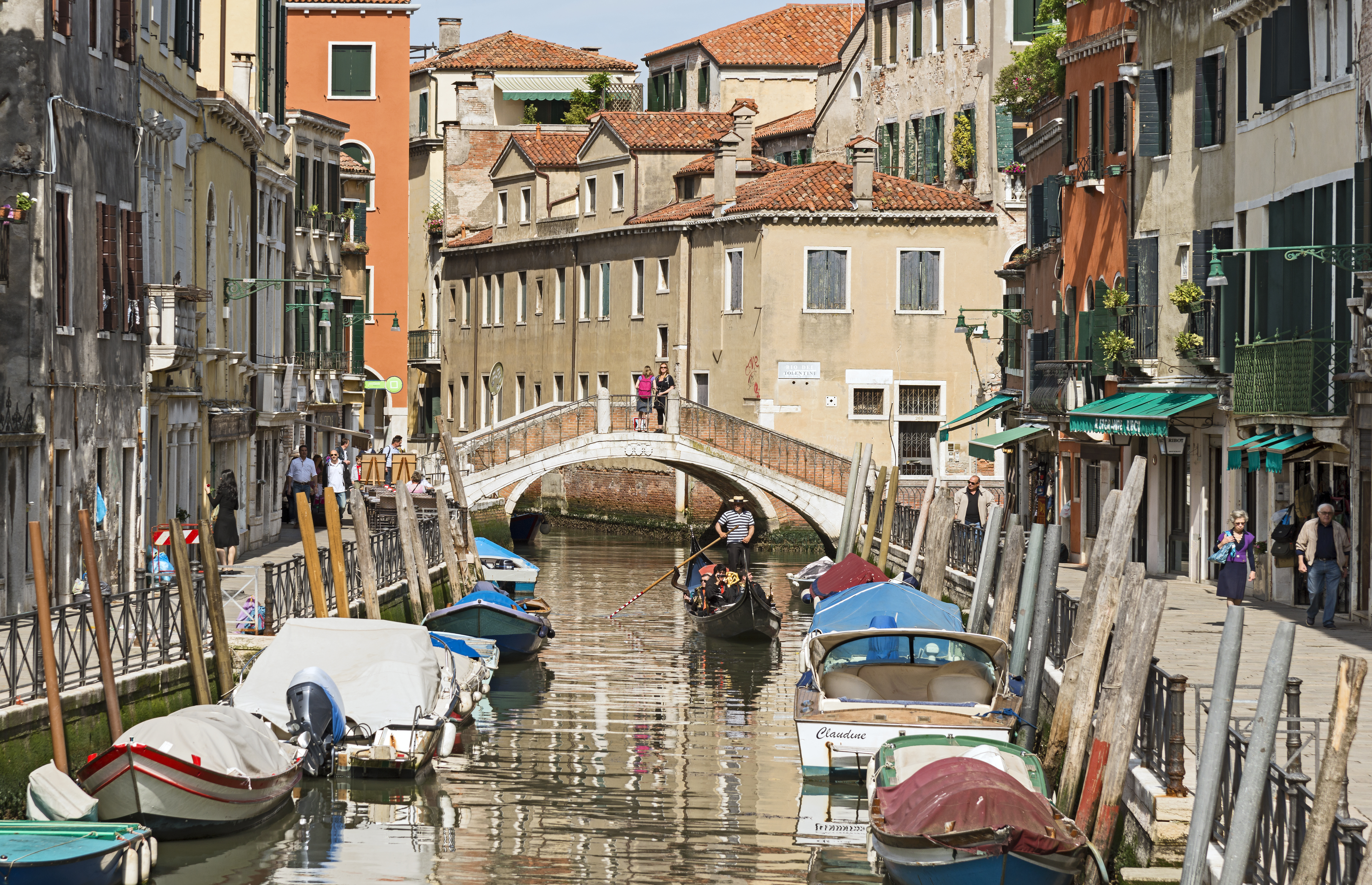
Ponte del Gaffaro
Rio del Gaffaro

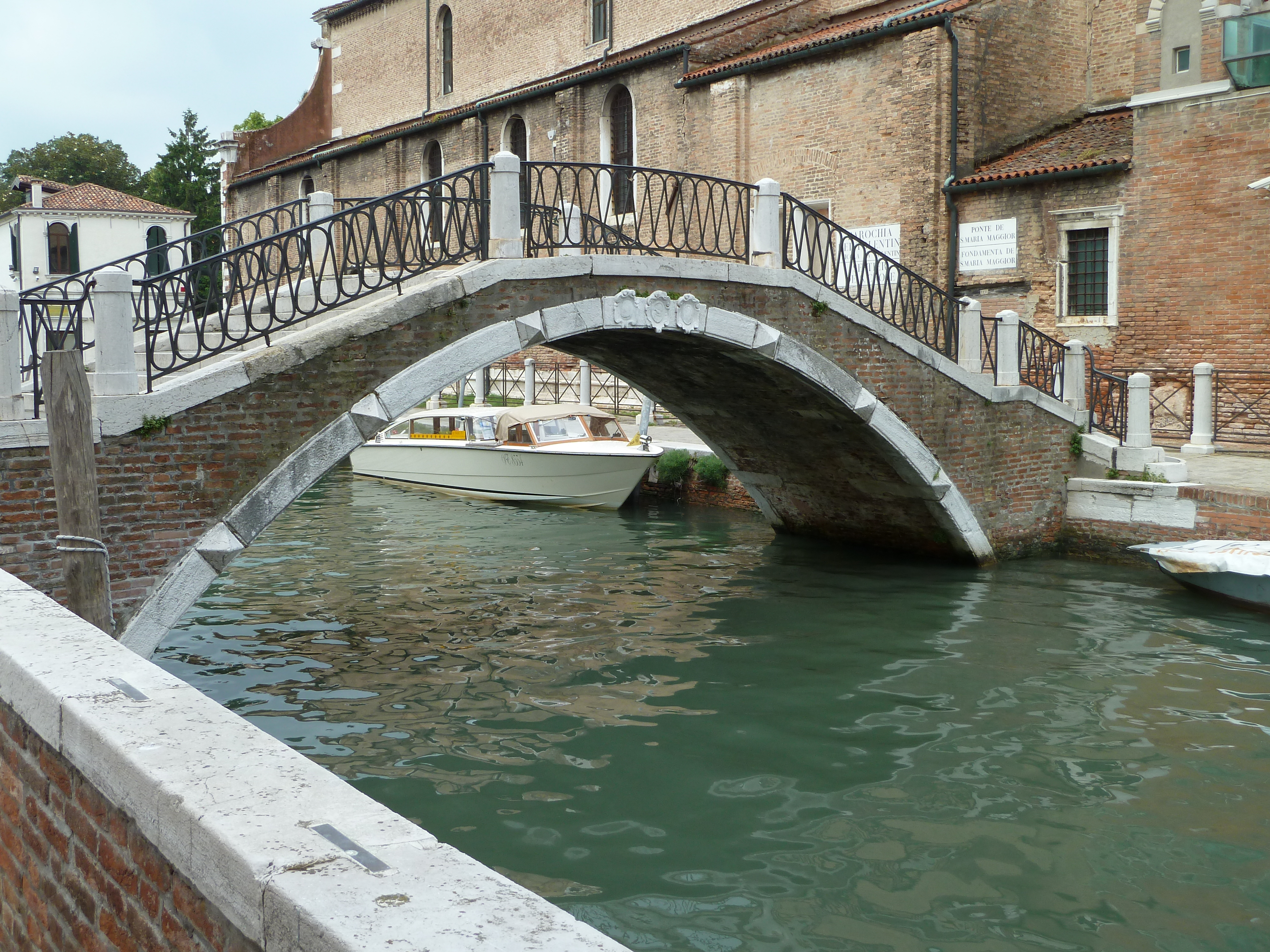
Ponte Santa Maria Maggior
Rio de Santa Maria Maggior

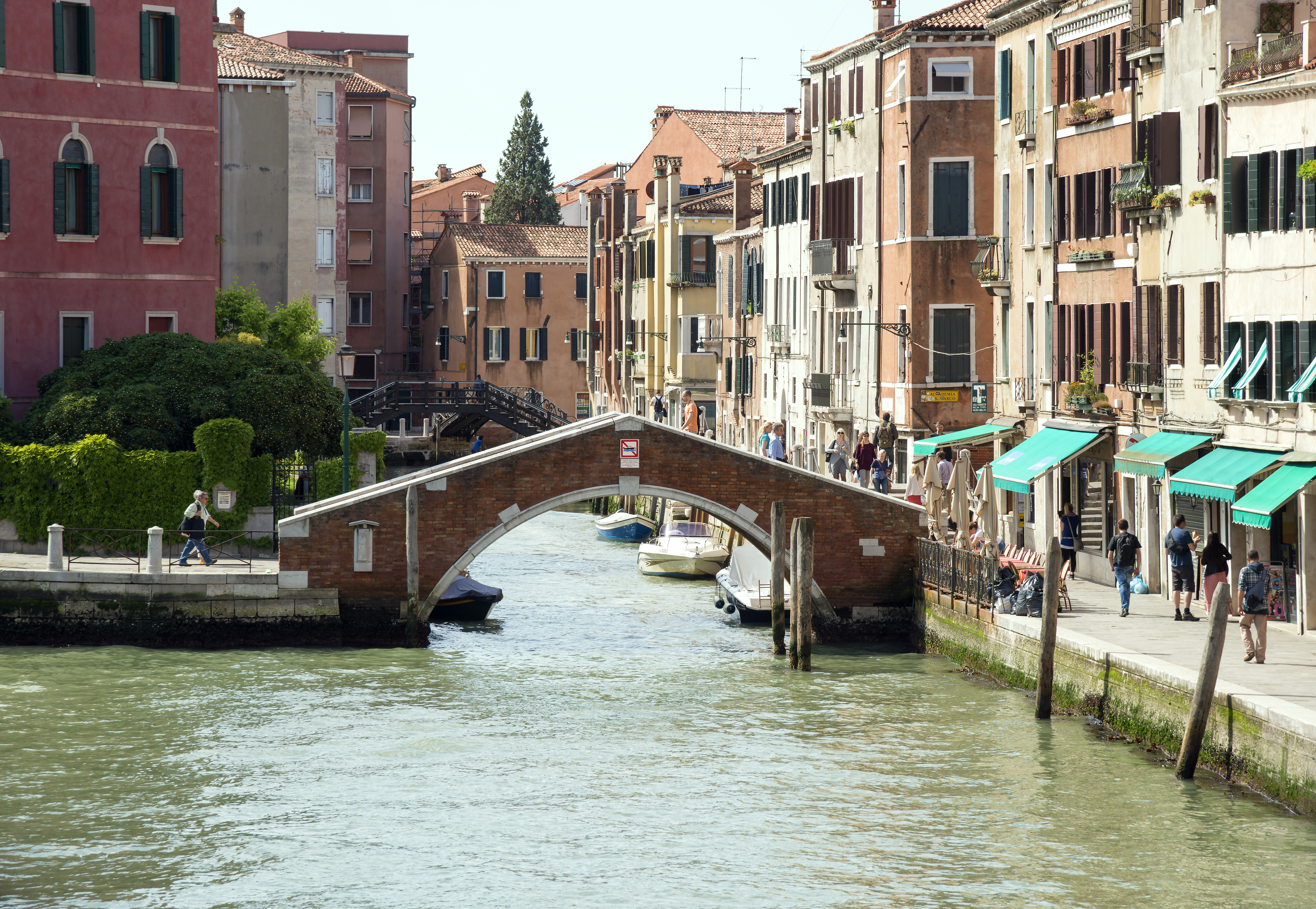
Ponte del Pagan
Rio dei Tre Ponti

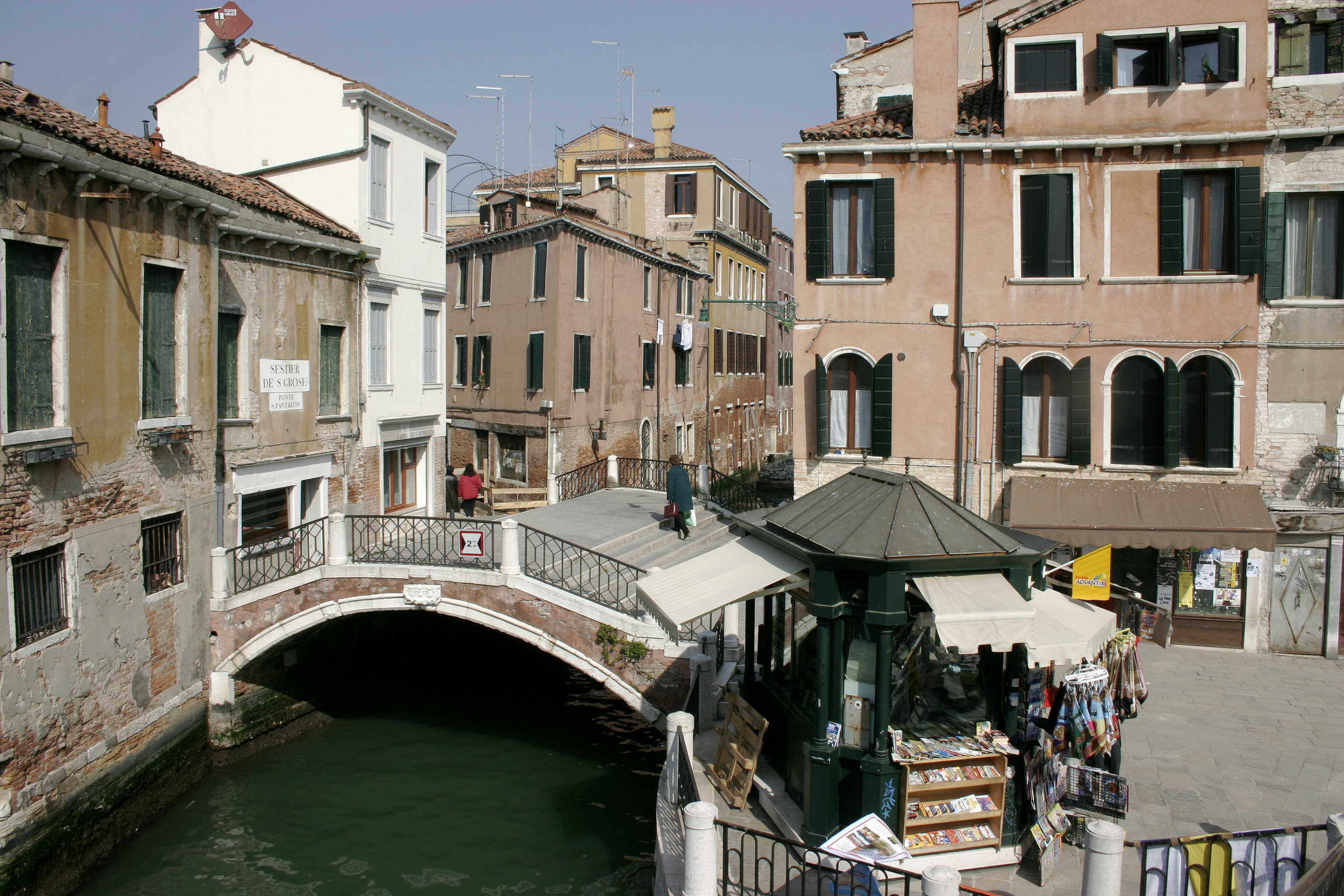
Ponte San Pantalon
Rio San Pantalon/Mosche
// au rio de Ca' Foscari

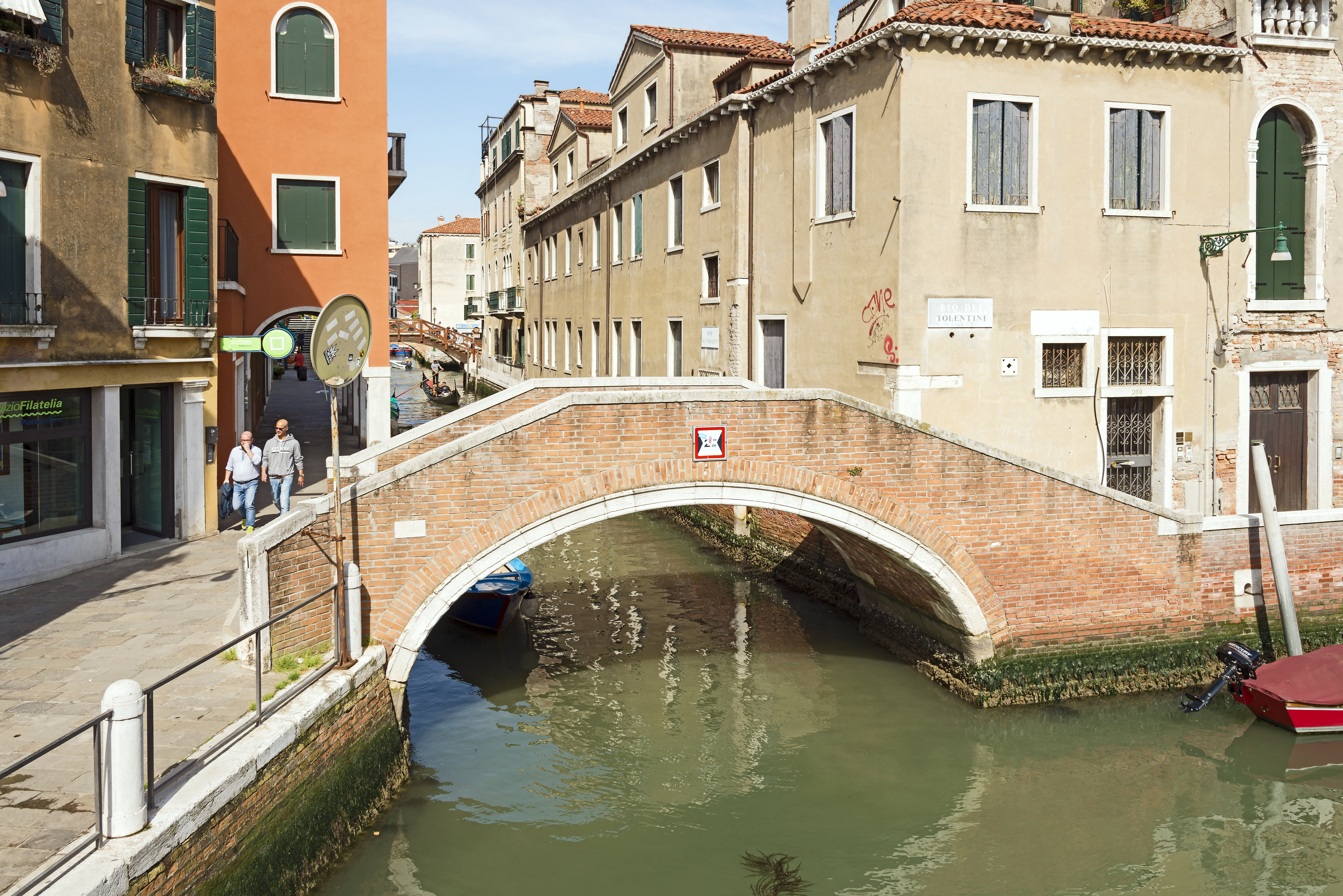
Ponte dei Squartai
Rio del Gaffaro

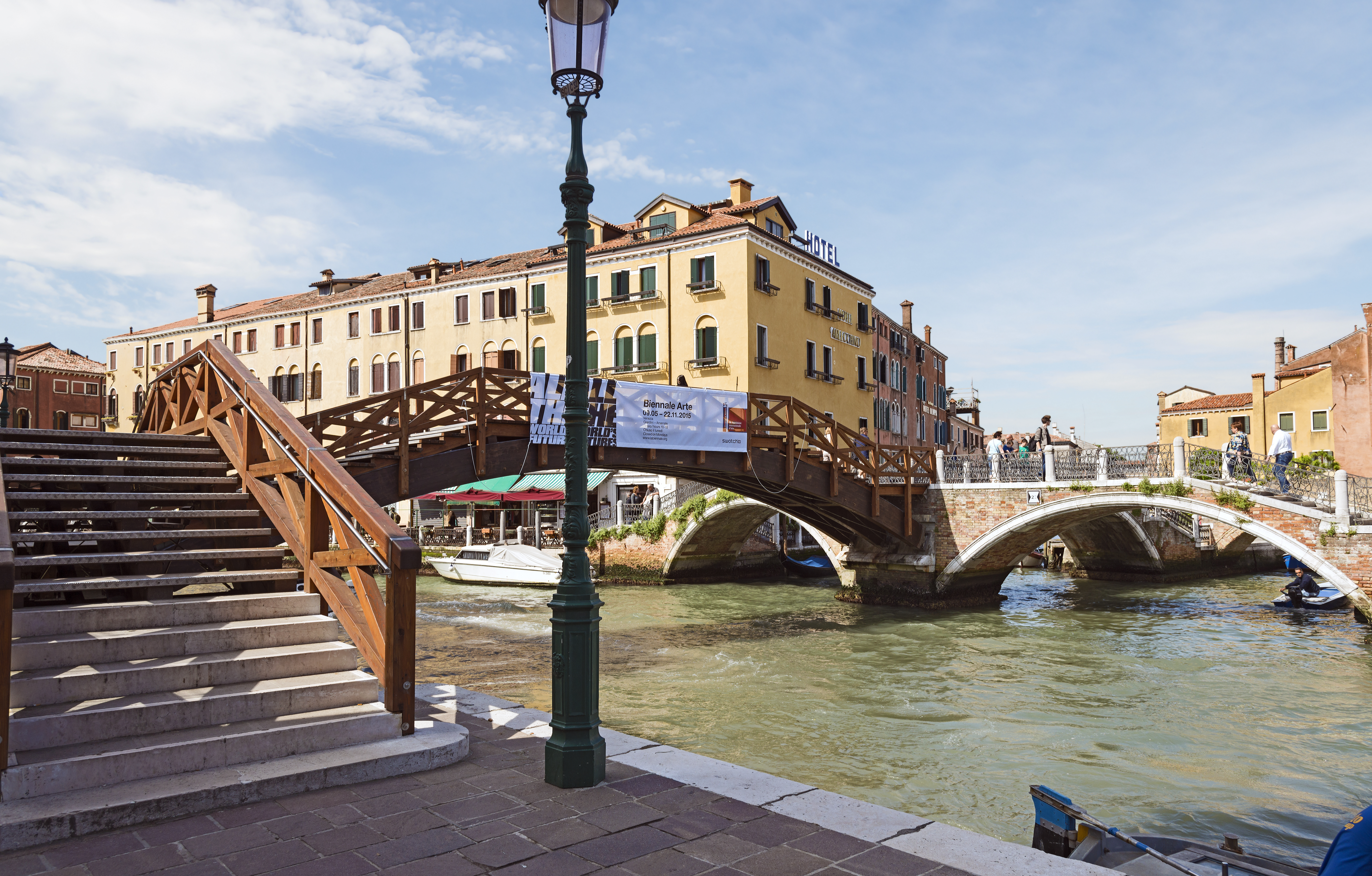
Ponte dei tre ponti
Rio de le Burchiele

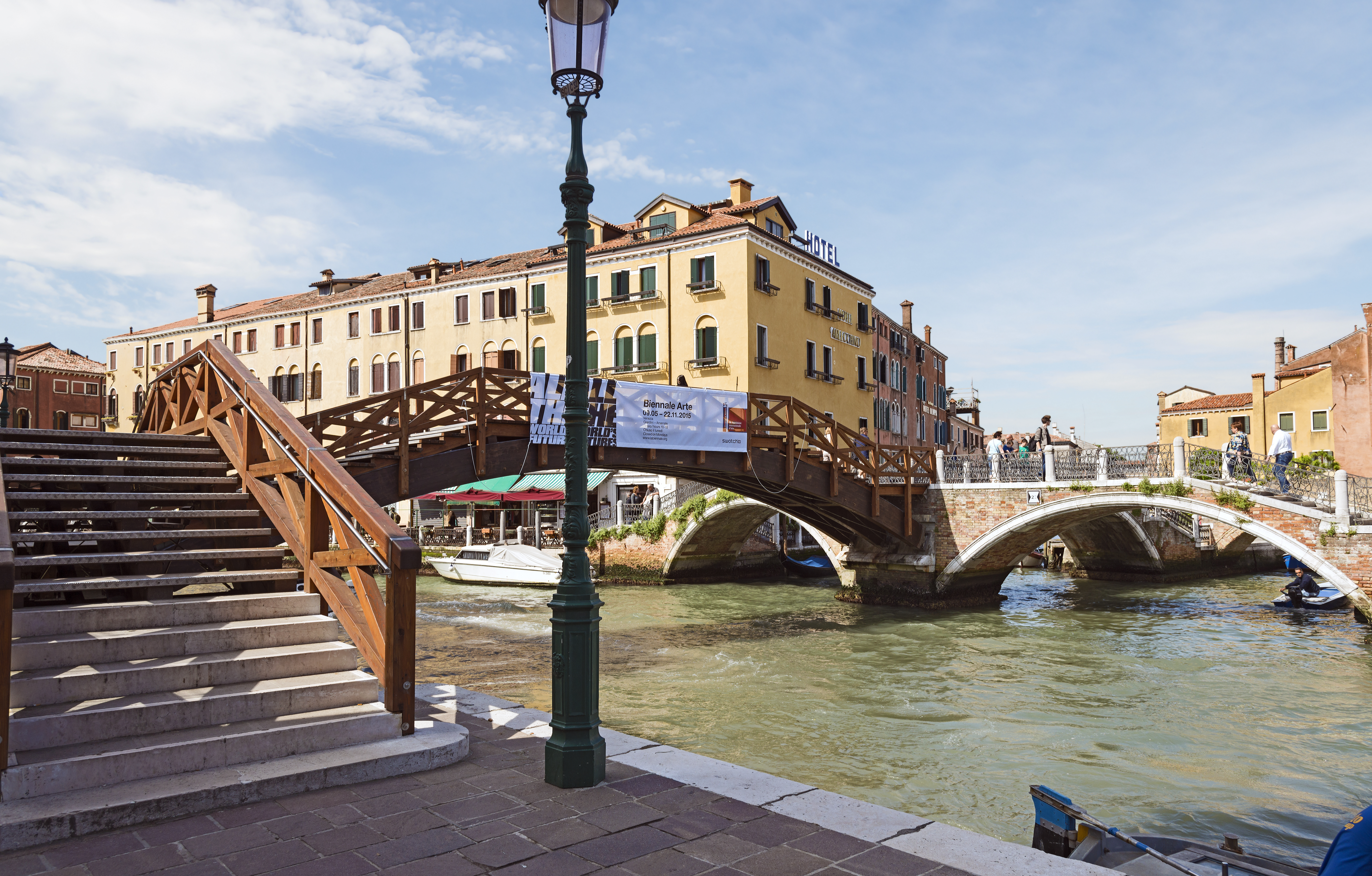
Ponte dei tre ponti
Rio Novo

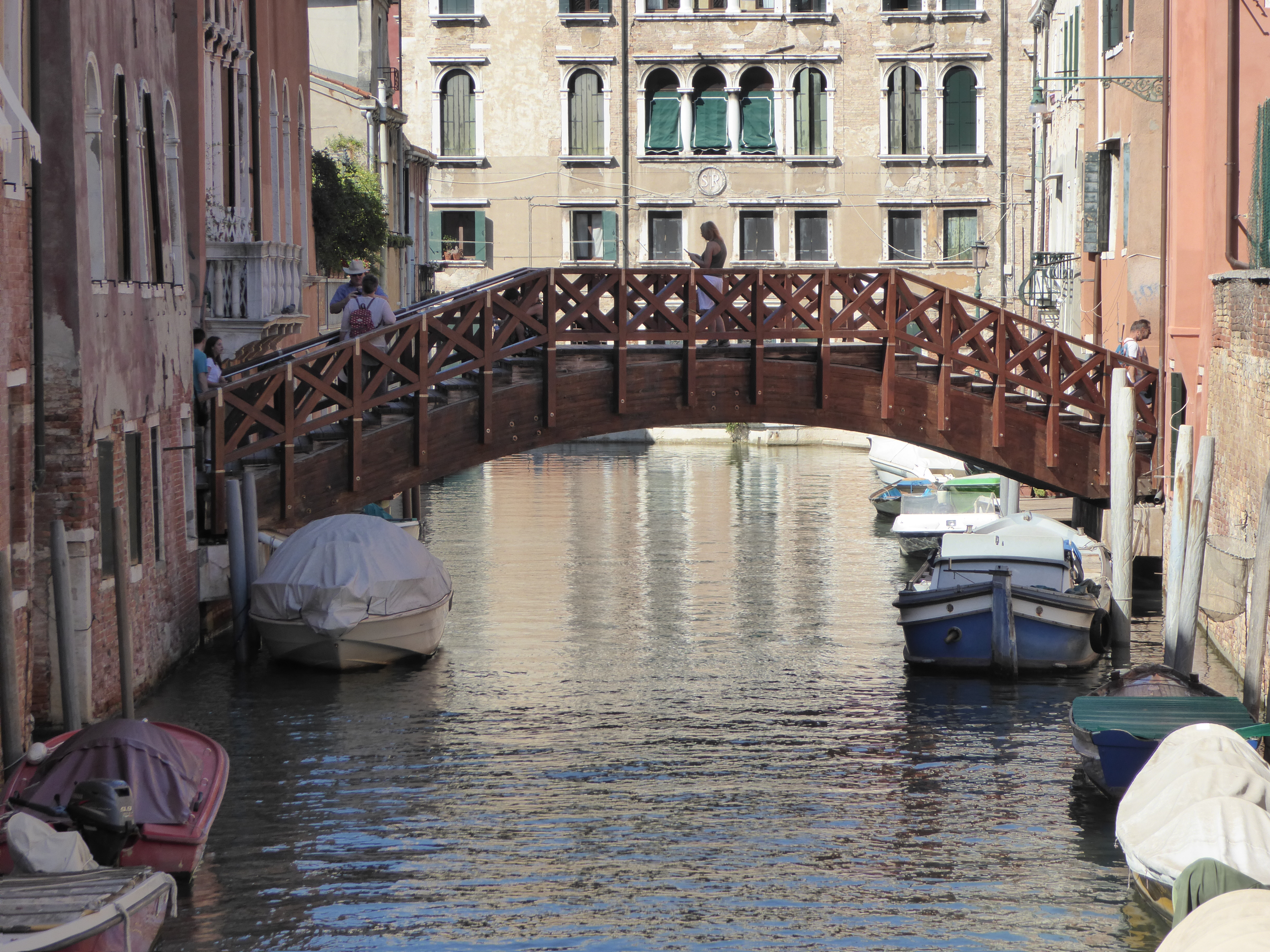
Ponte Vinanti
Rio de le Mosche

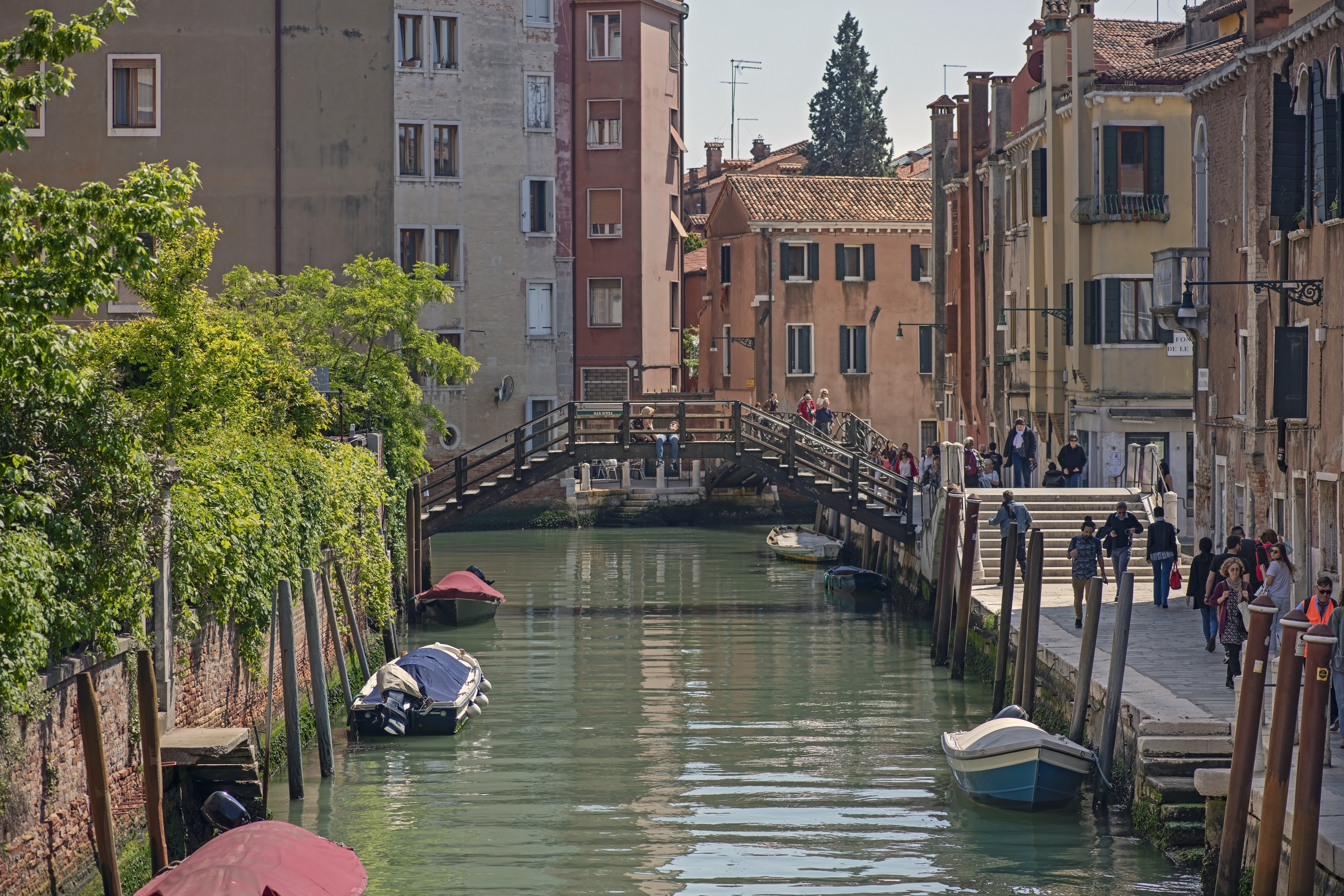
private bridge over the rio dei Tre Ponti

=== Border Santa Croce-San Polo ===
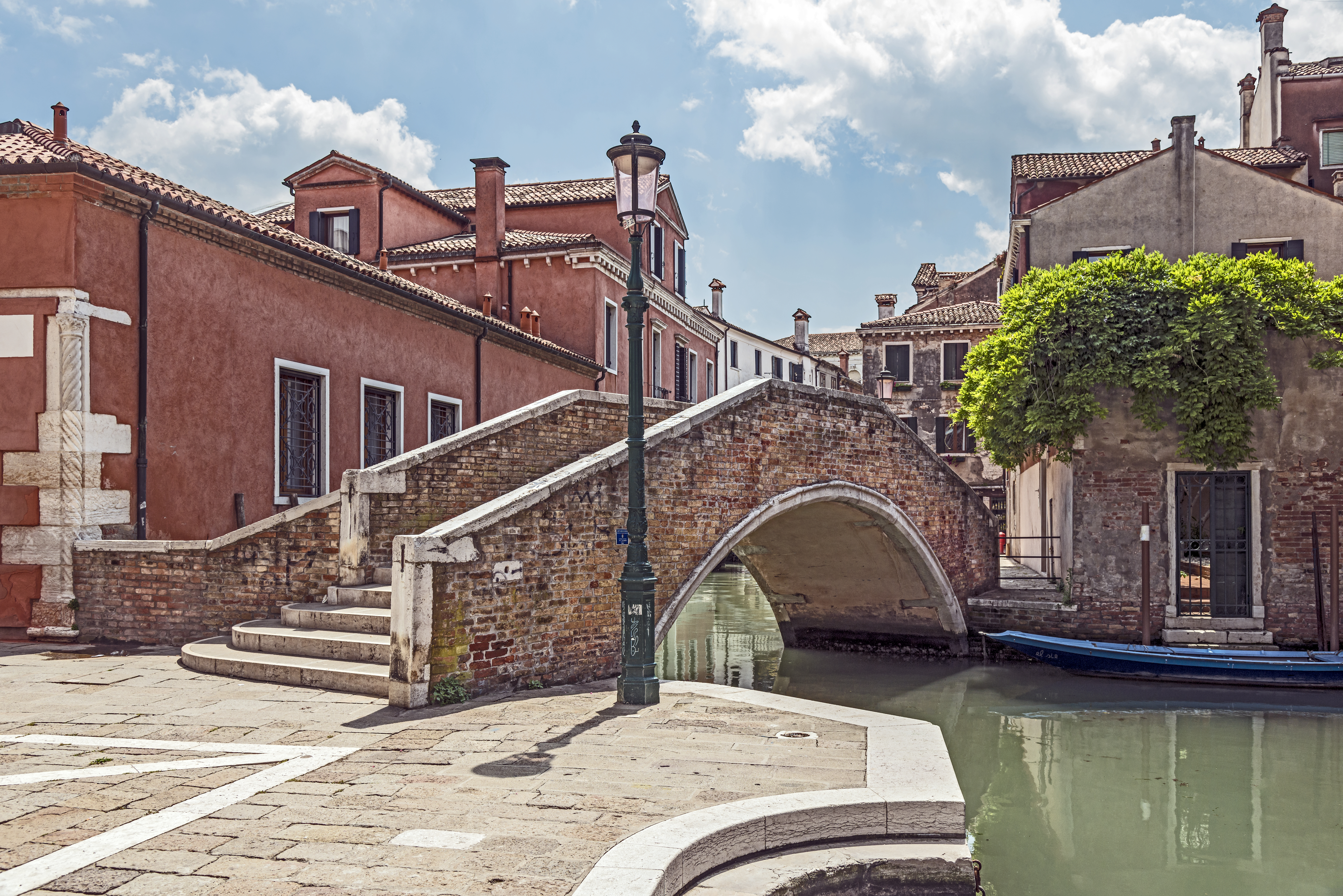
Ponte San Boldo
Rio de San Giacomo de l'Orio

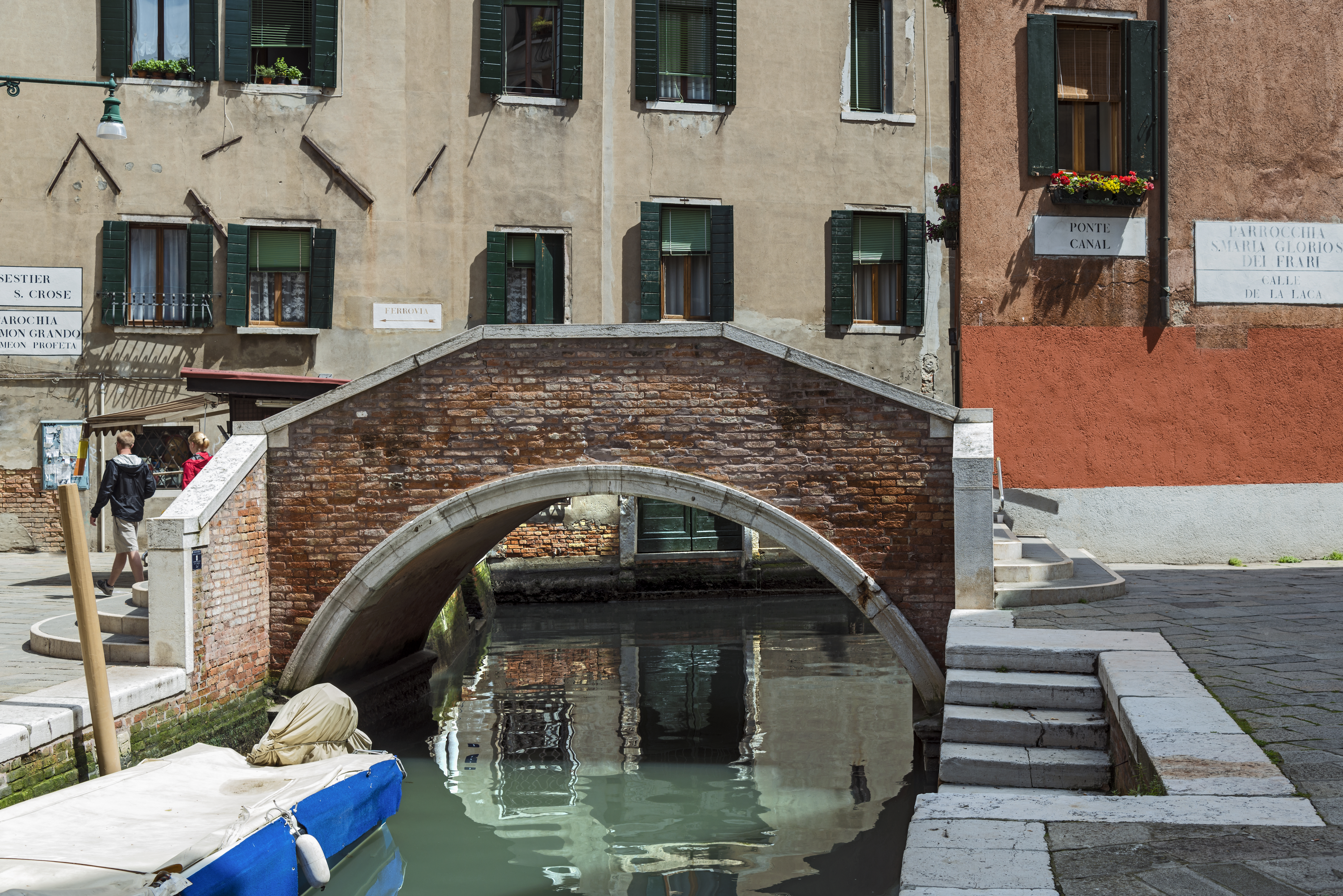
Ponte Canal
Rio de le Muneghe

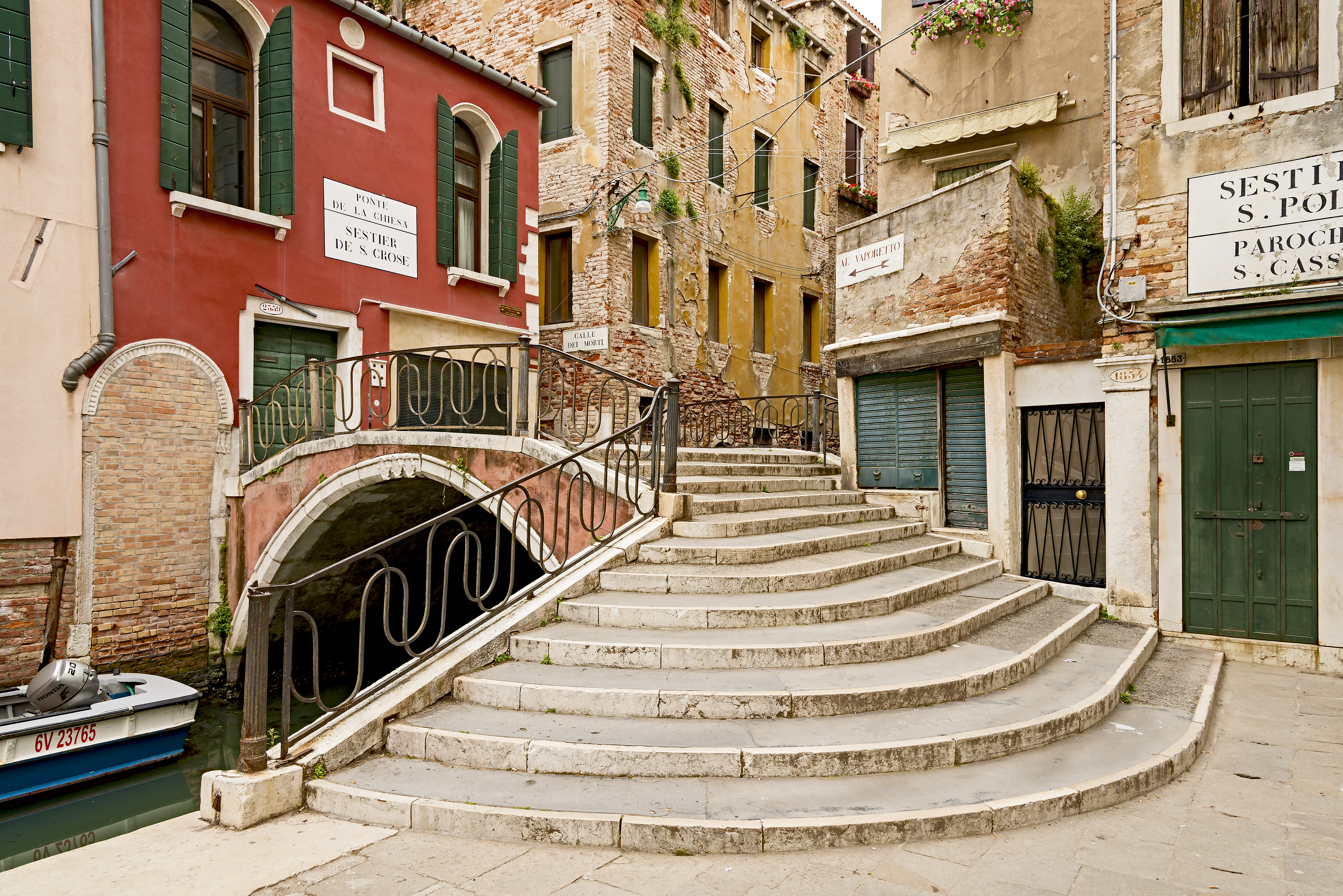
Ponte dei Morti o della Chiesa
Rio de San Cassan

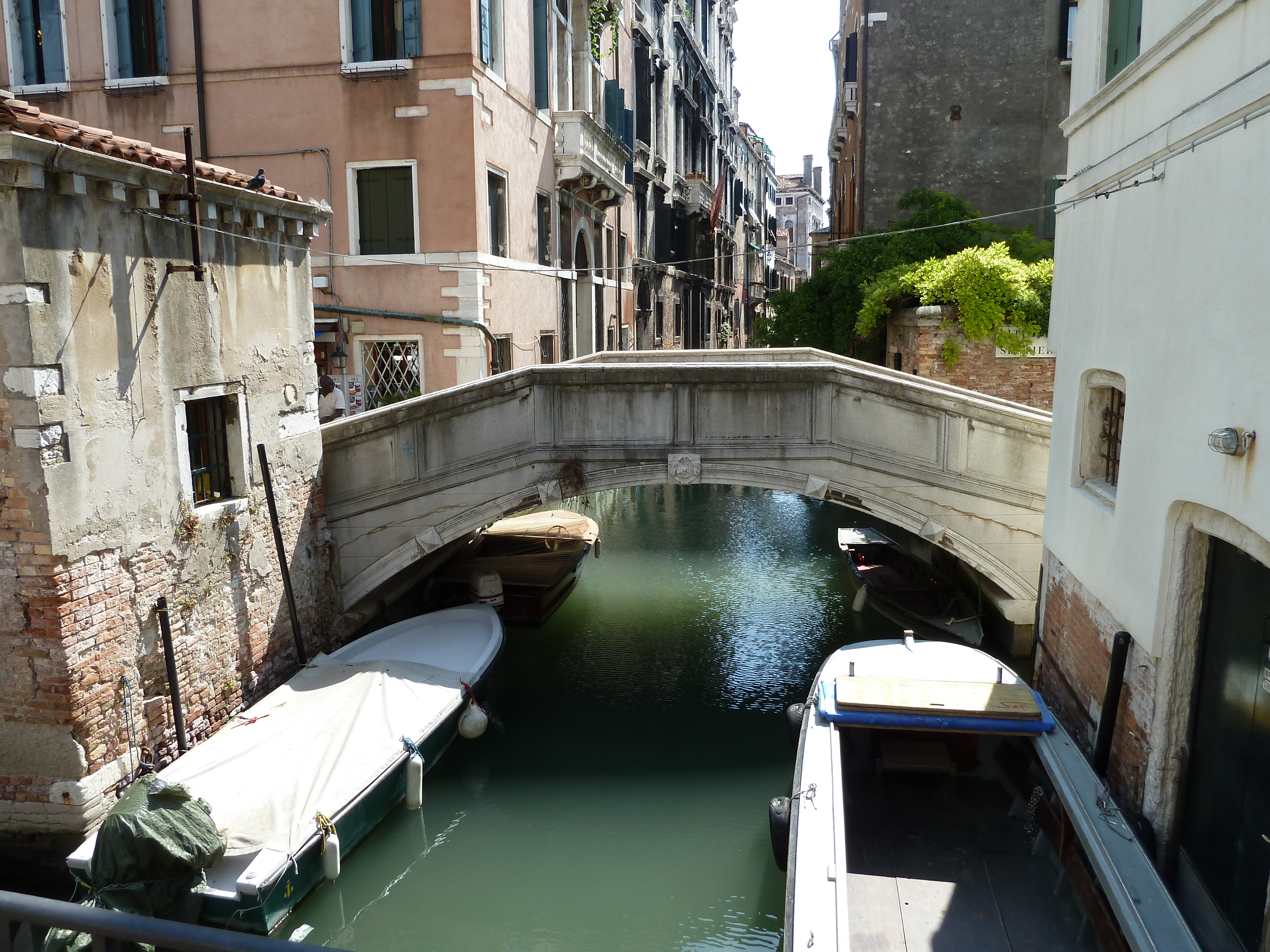
Ponte G.A. della Croce
Rio de San Cassan

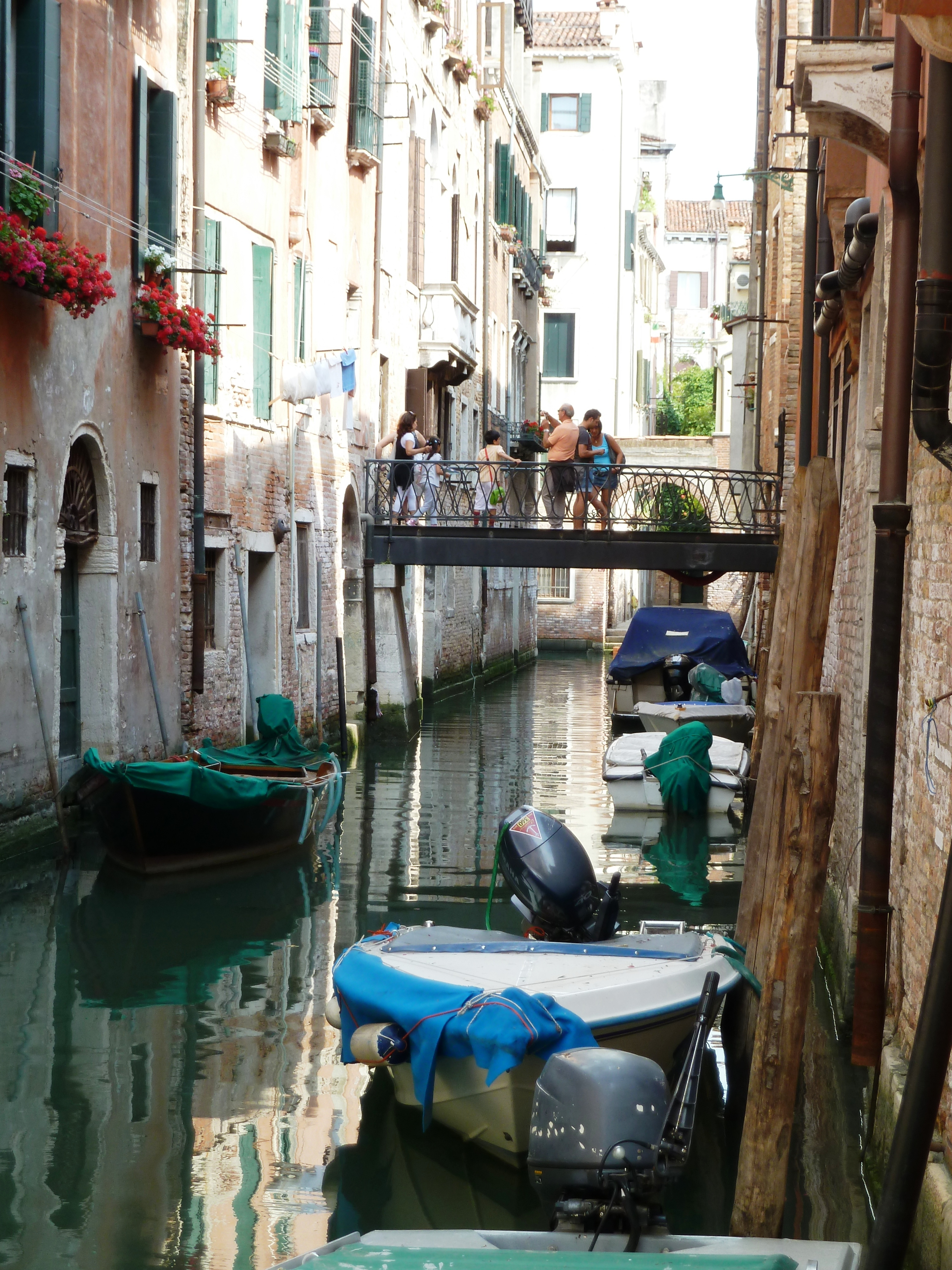
Ponte del Forner/S.Antonio
Rio de San Boldo

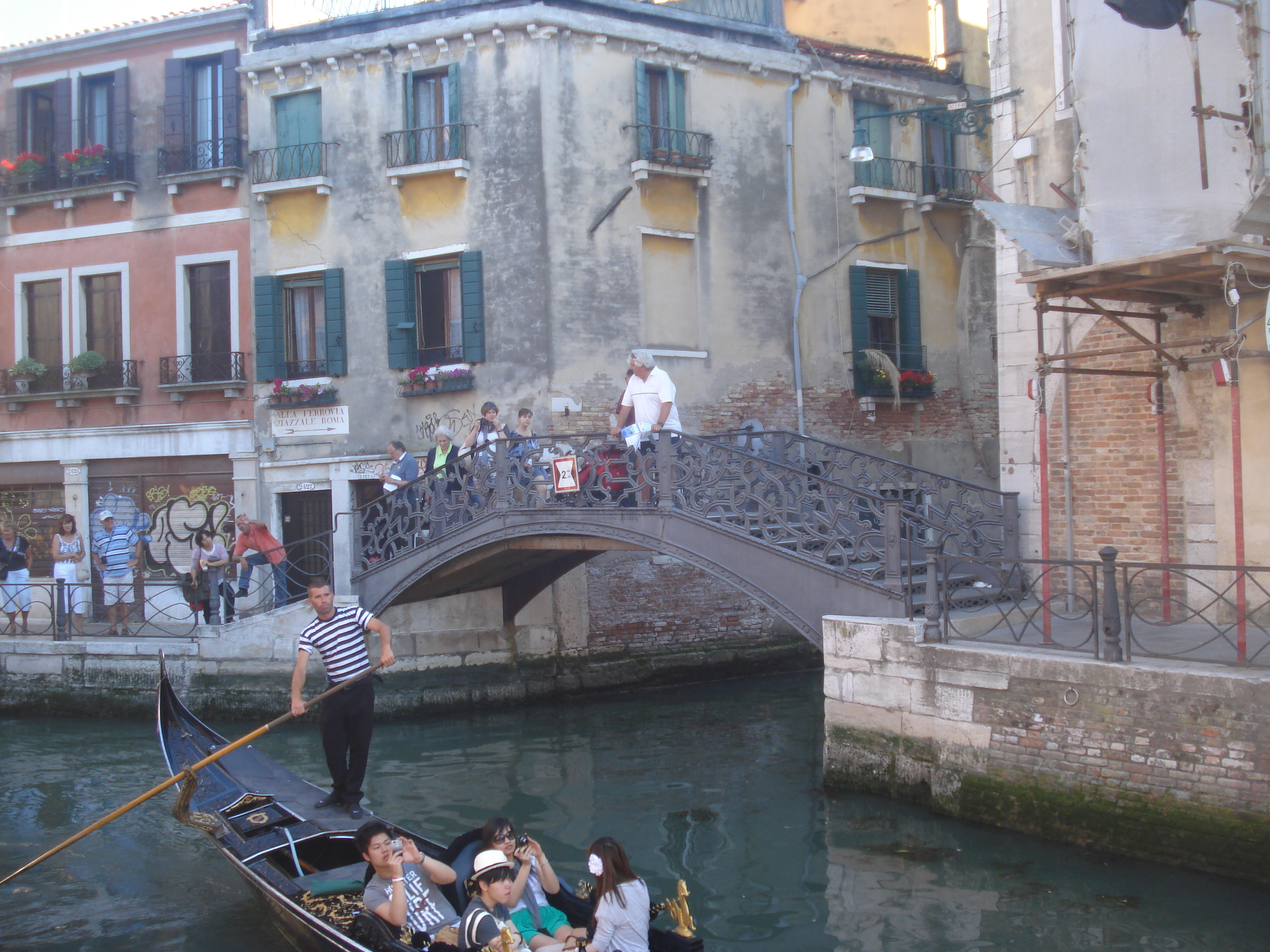
Ponte della Latte
Rio de San Zuane
// au S.Giacomo dell'Orio

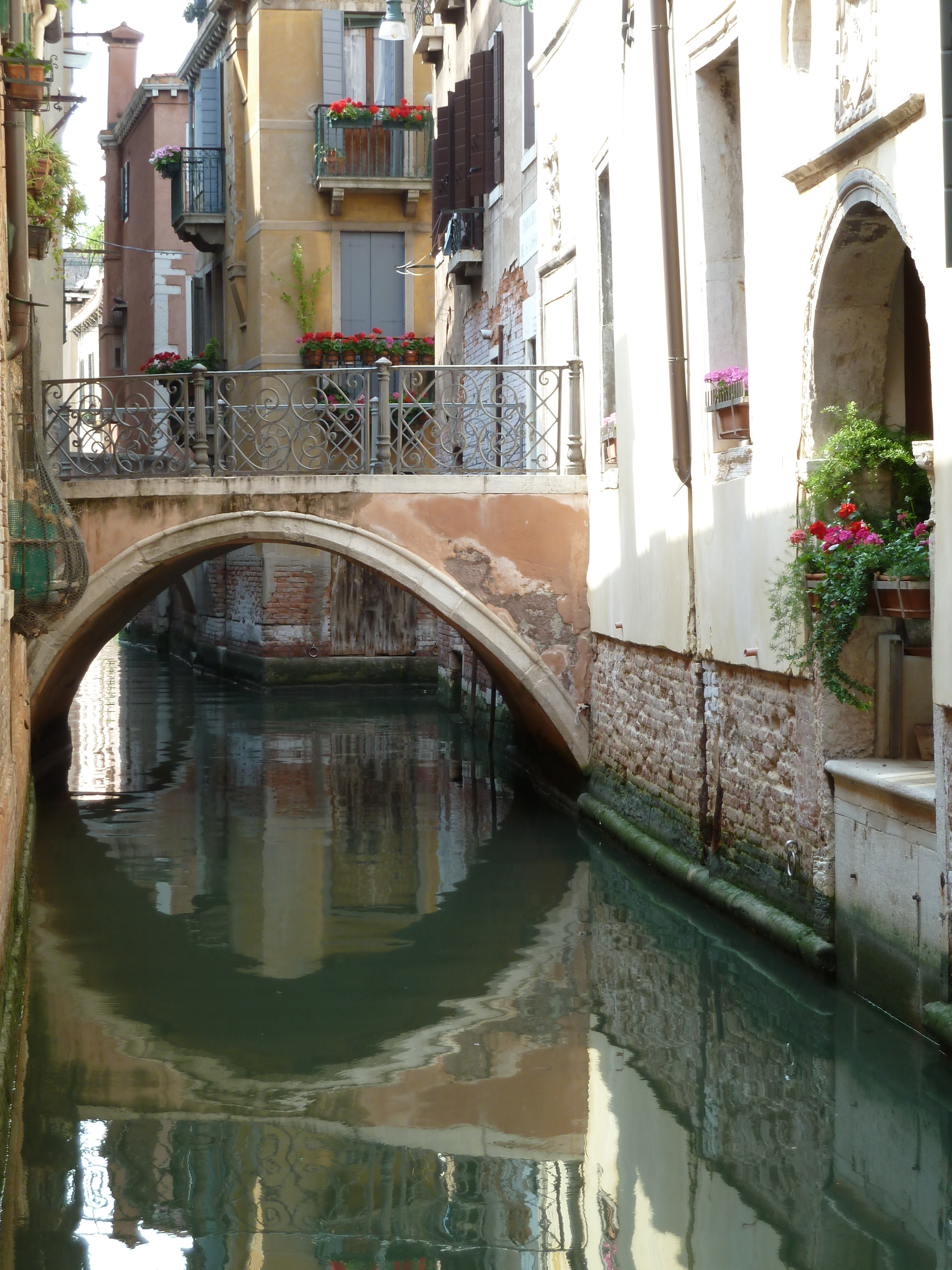
Ponte del Modena
Rio de San Boldo

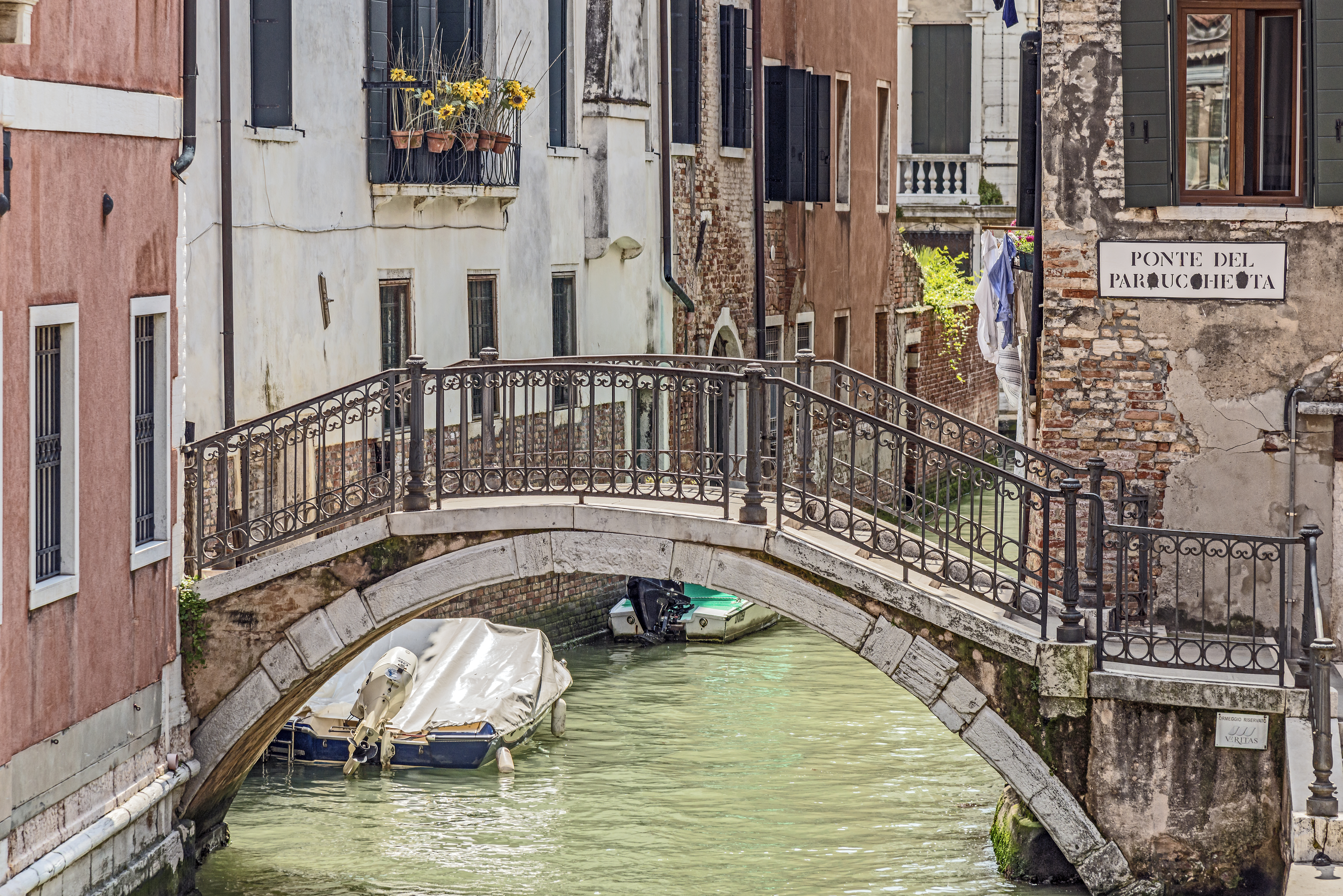
Ponte del Parucheta
Rio de San Giacomo dall'Orio

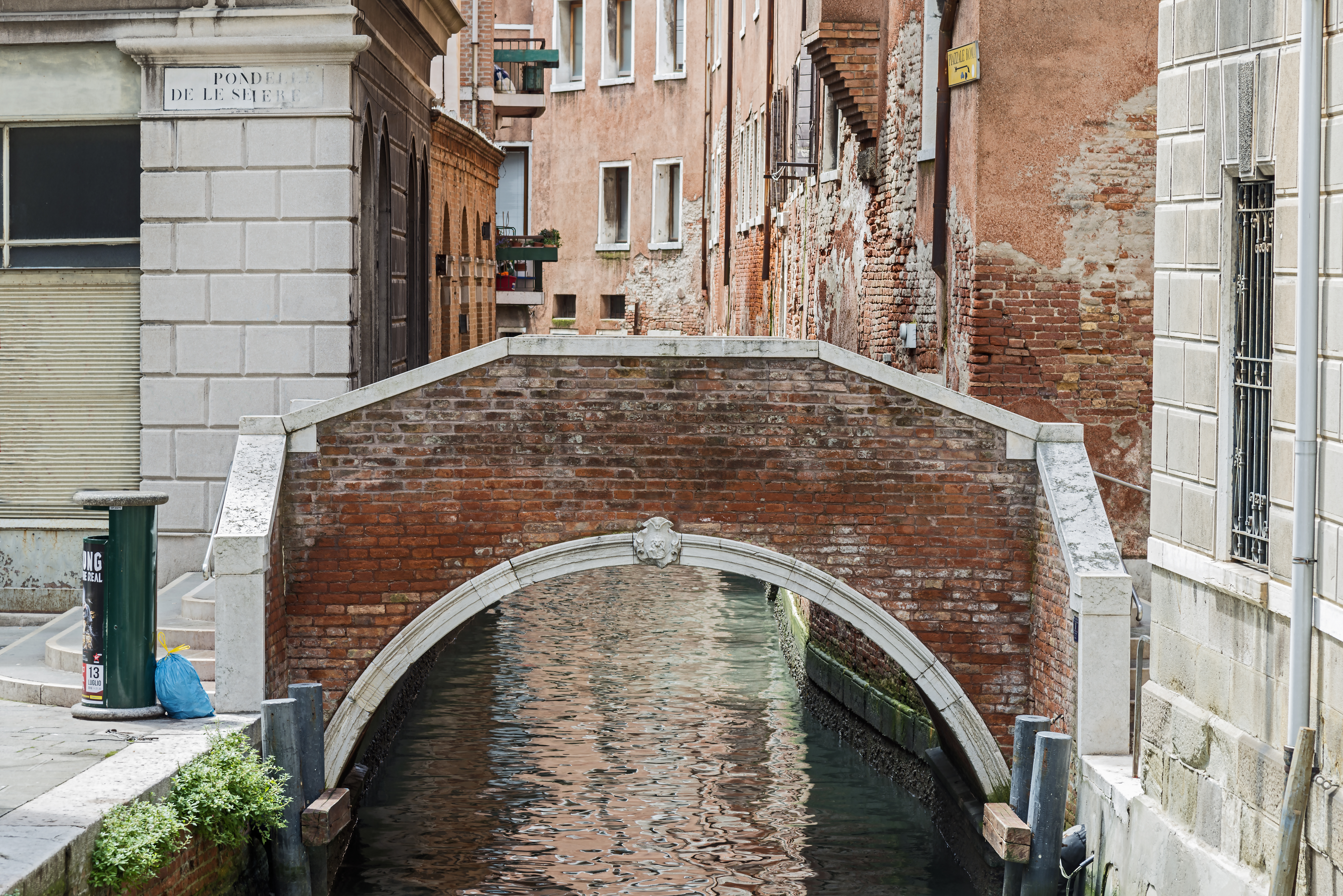
Ponte de le Sechere
Rio de le Muneghete

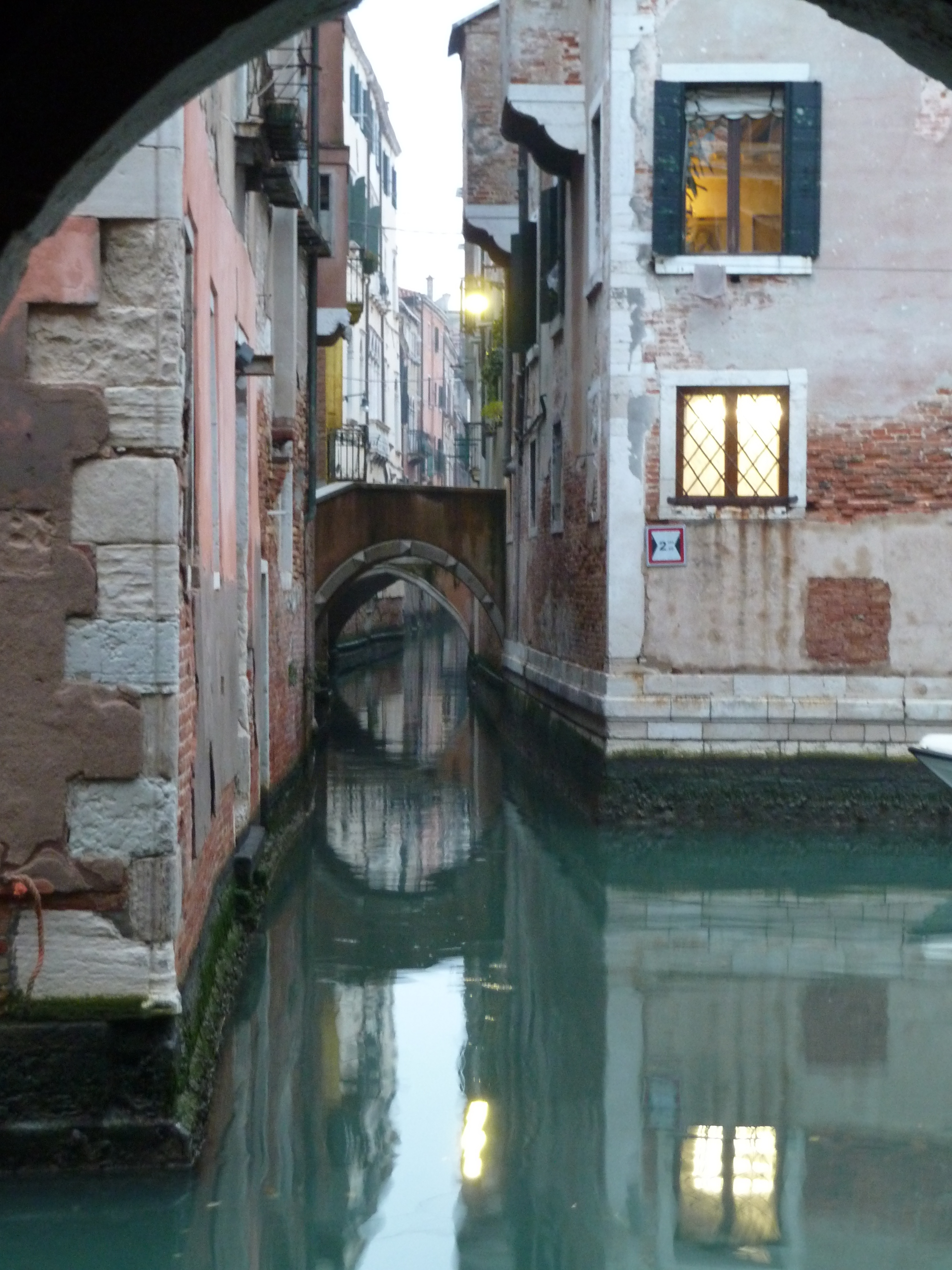
Ponte Storto
Rio de '''San Boldo'''

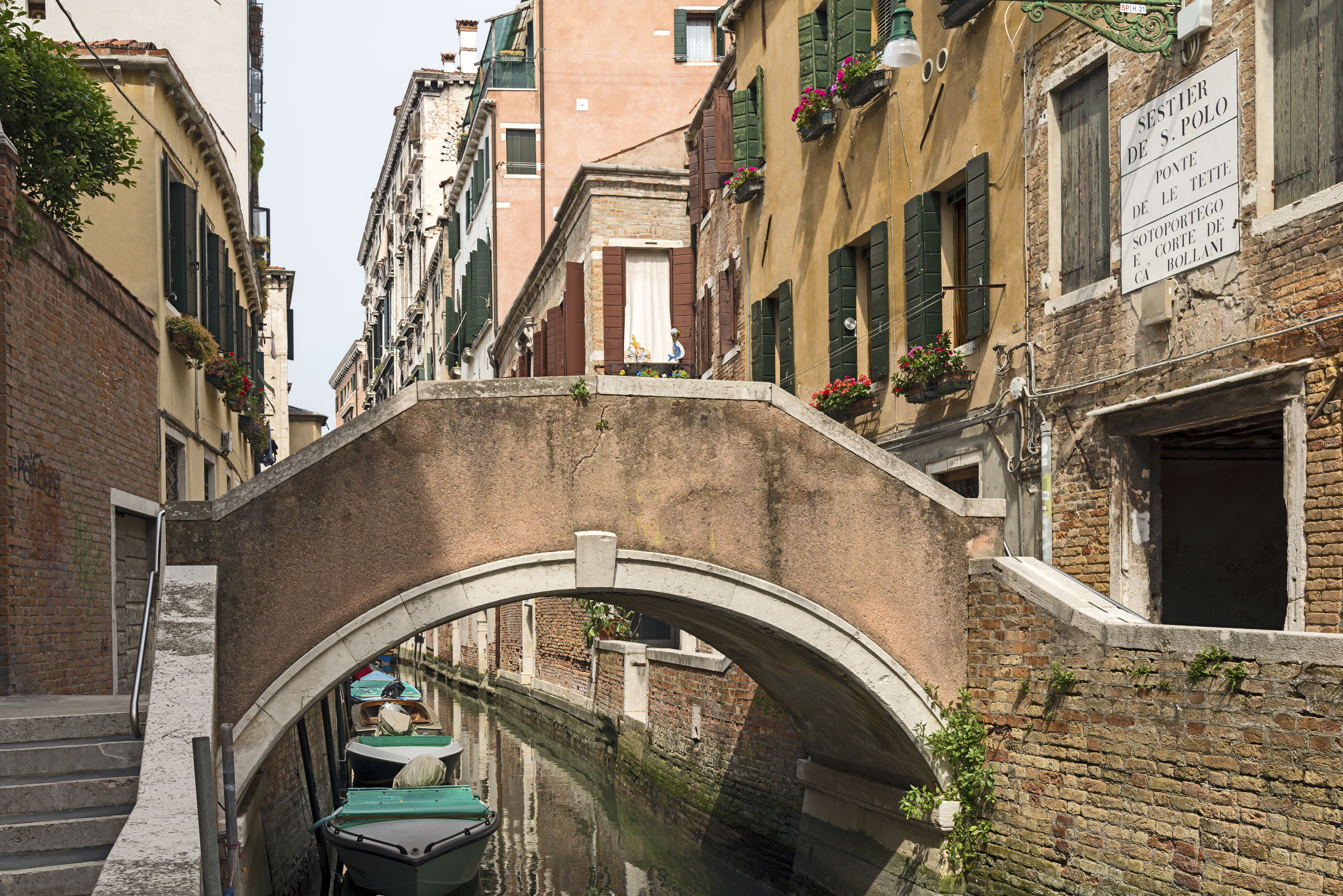
Ponte delle Tette'
Rio de San Cassan

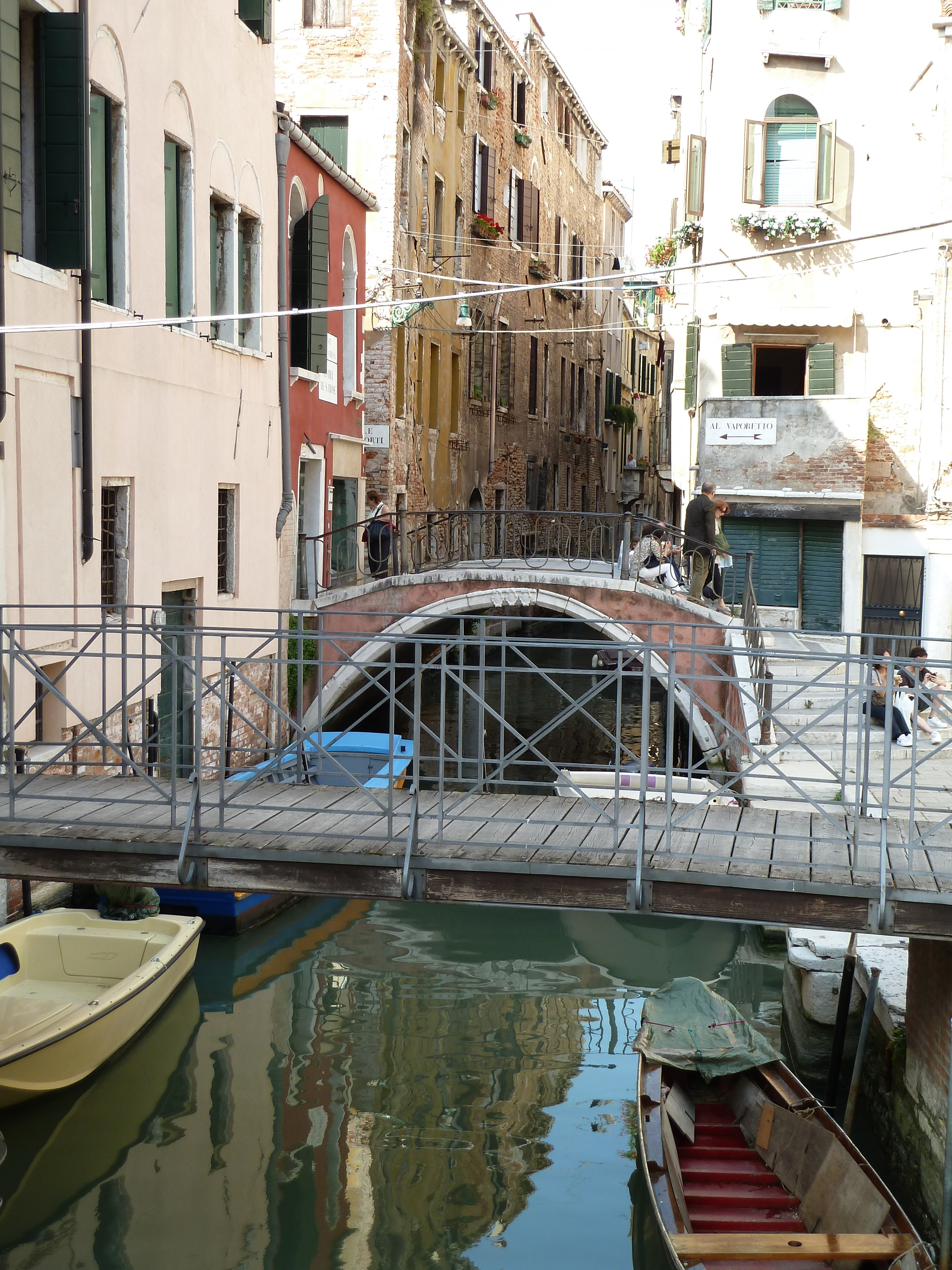
Pont privé sur le rio de San Cassan

== Sestieri of San Polo ==
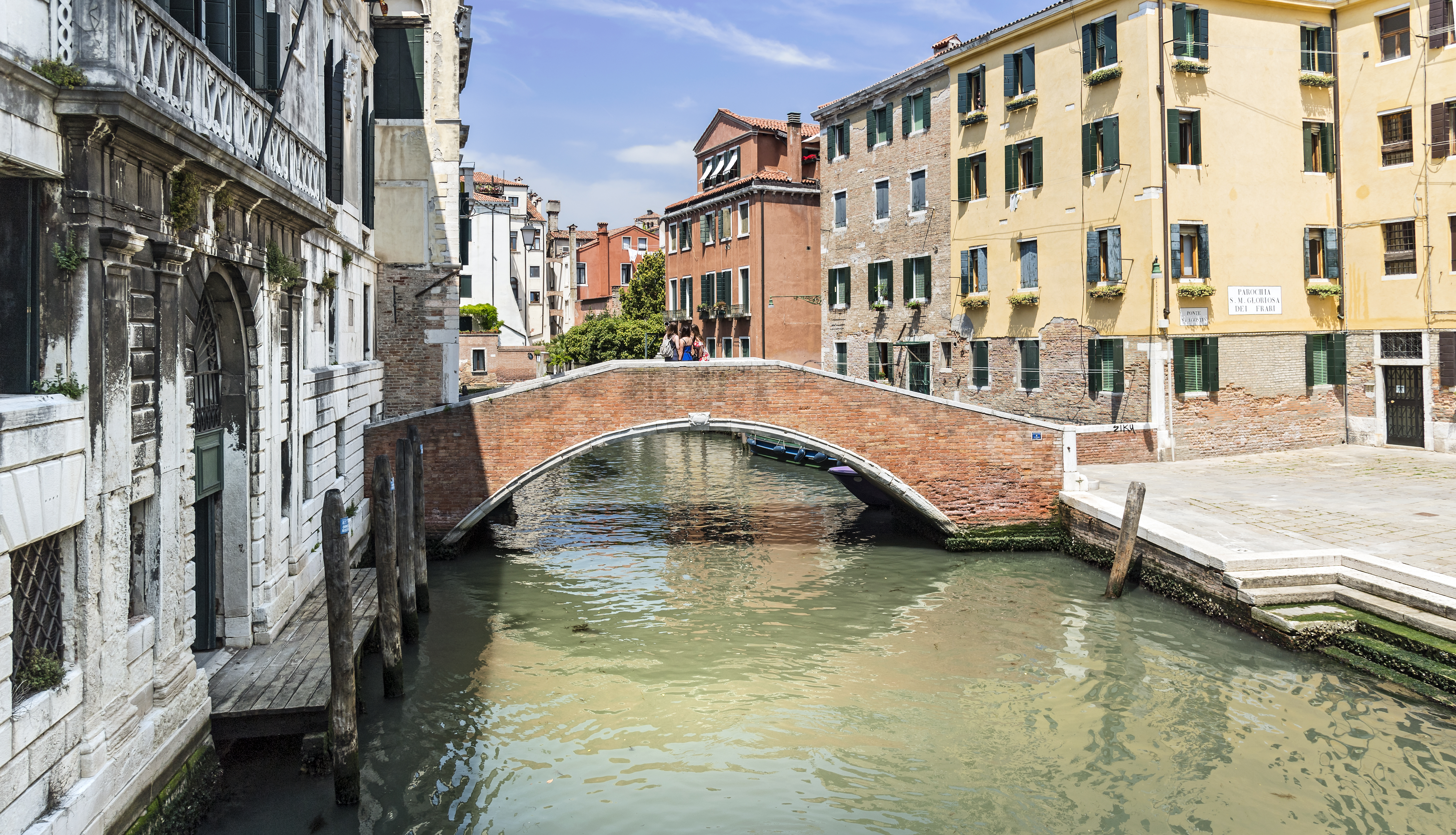
Ponte Sant'Agostin
Rio de Sant'Agostin

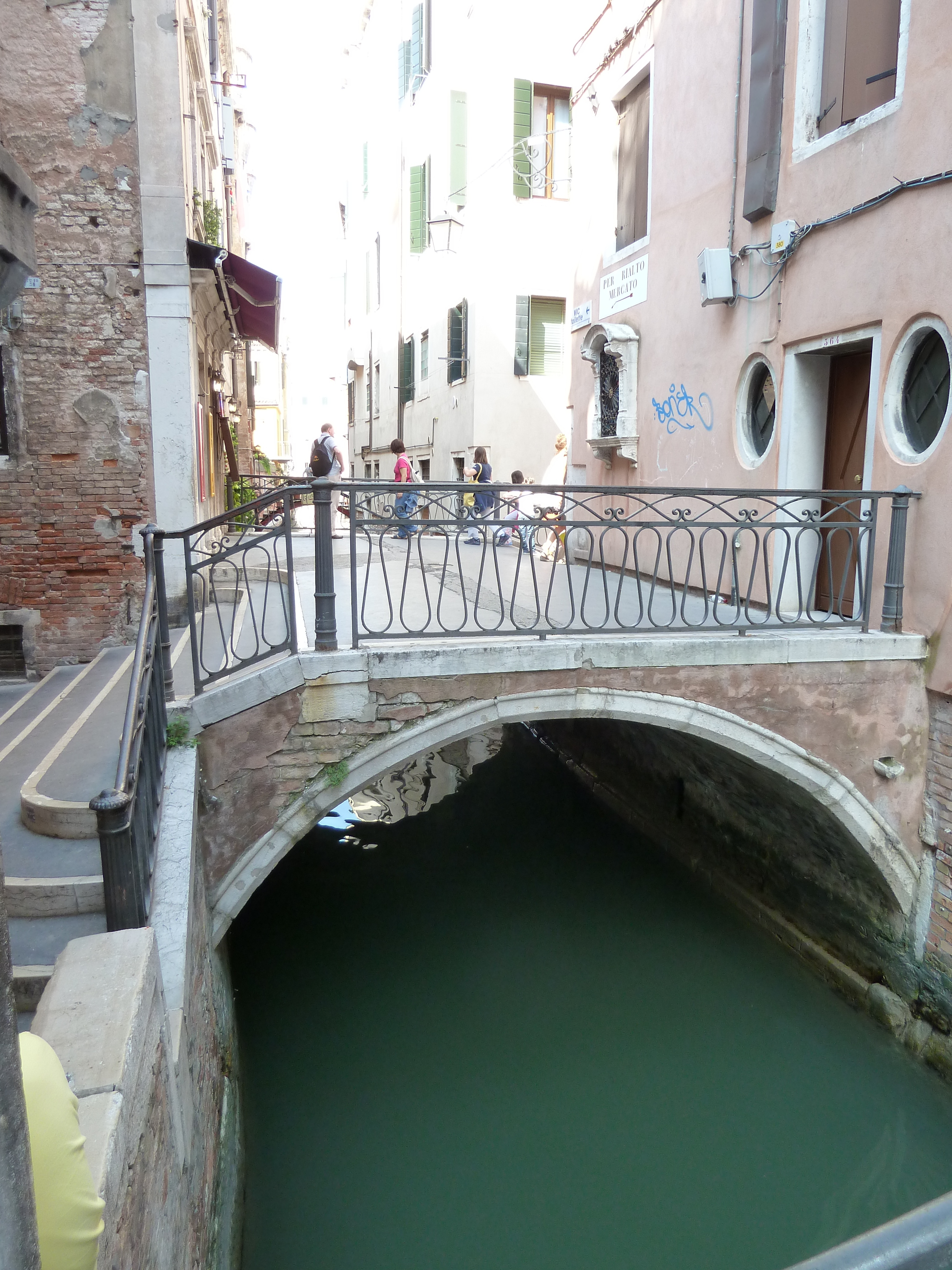
Ponte de le Becarie
Rio de le Becarie

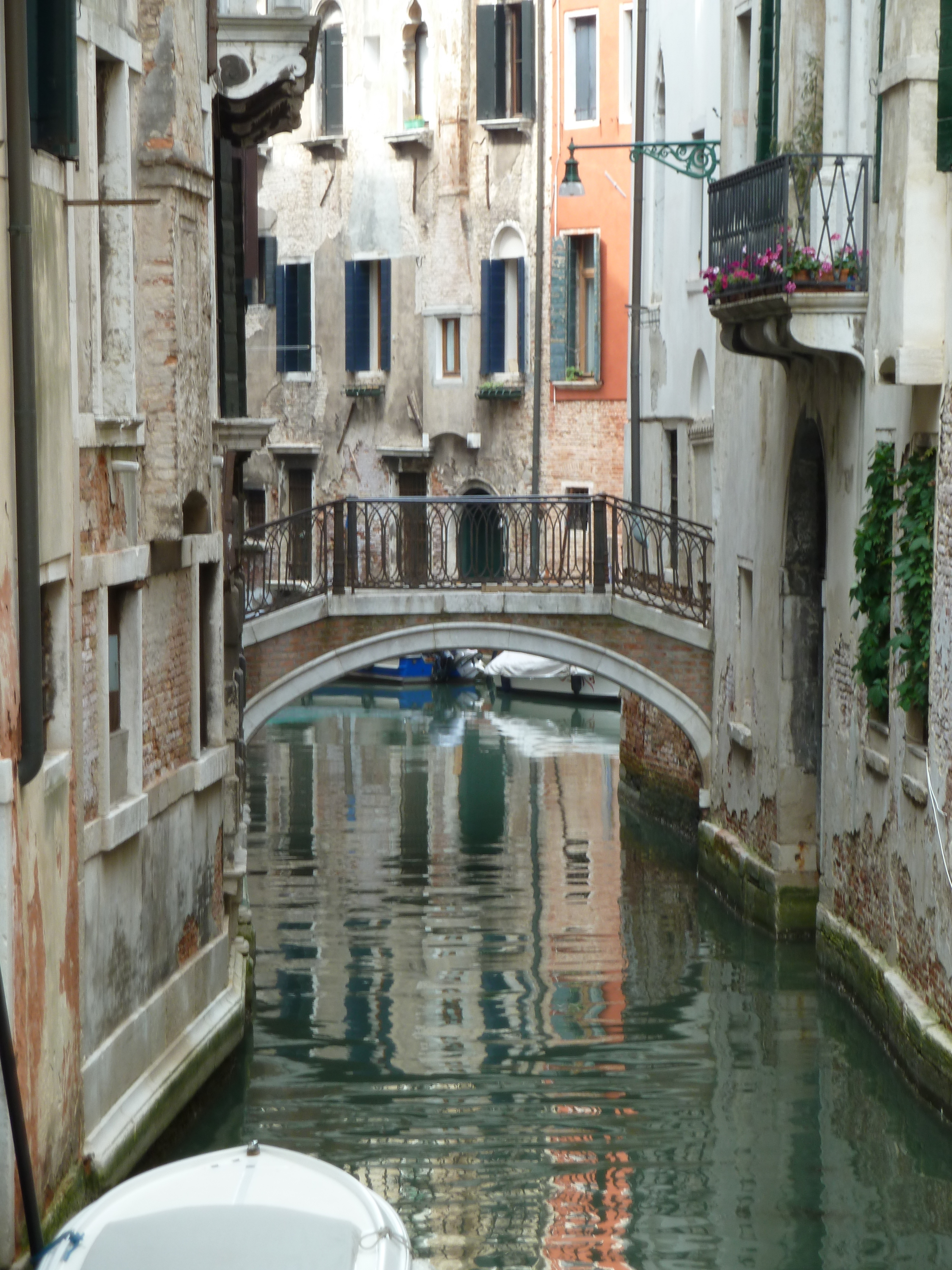
Ponte Cavalli
Rio de la Madoneta

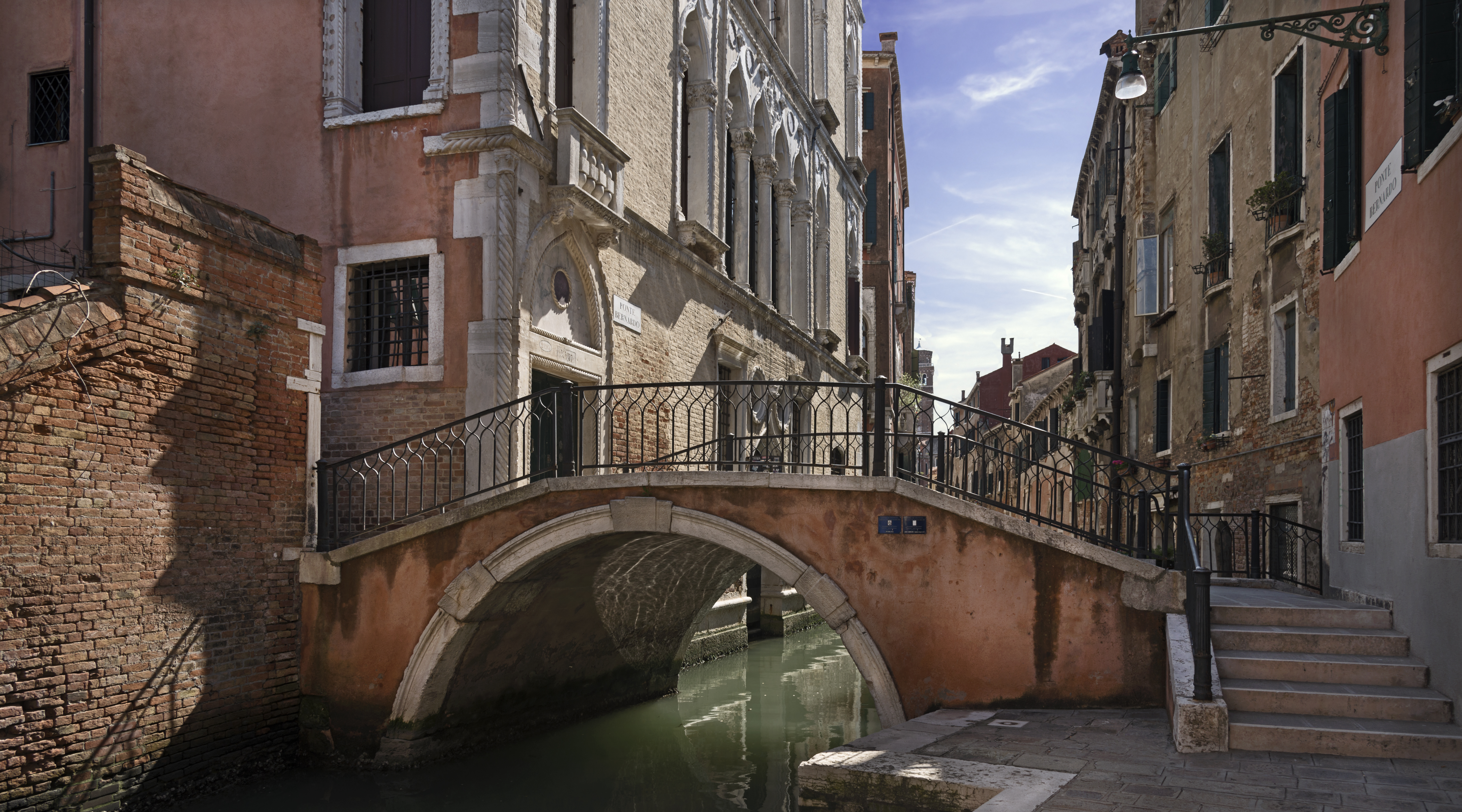
Ponte de Ca' Bernardo
Rio de San Polo

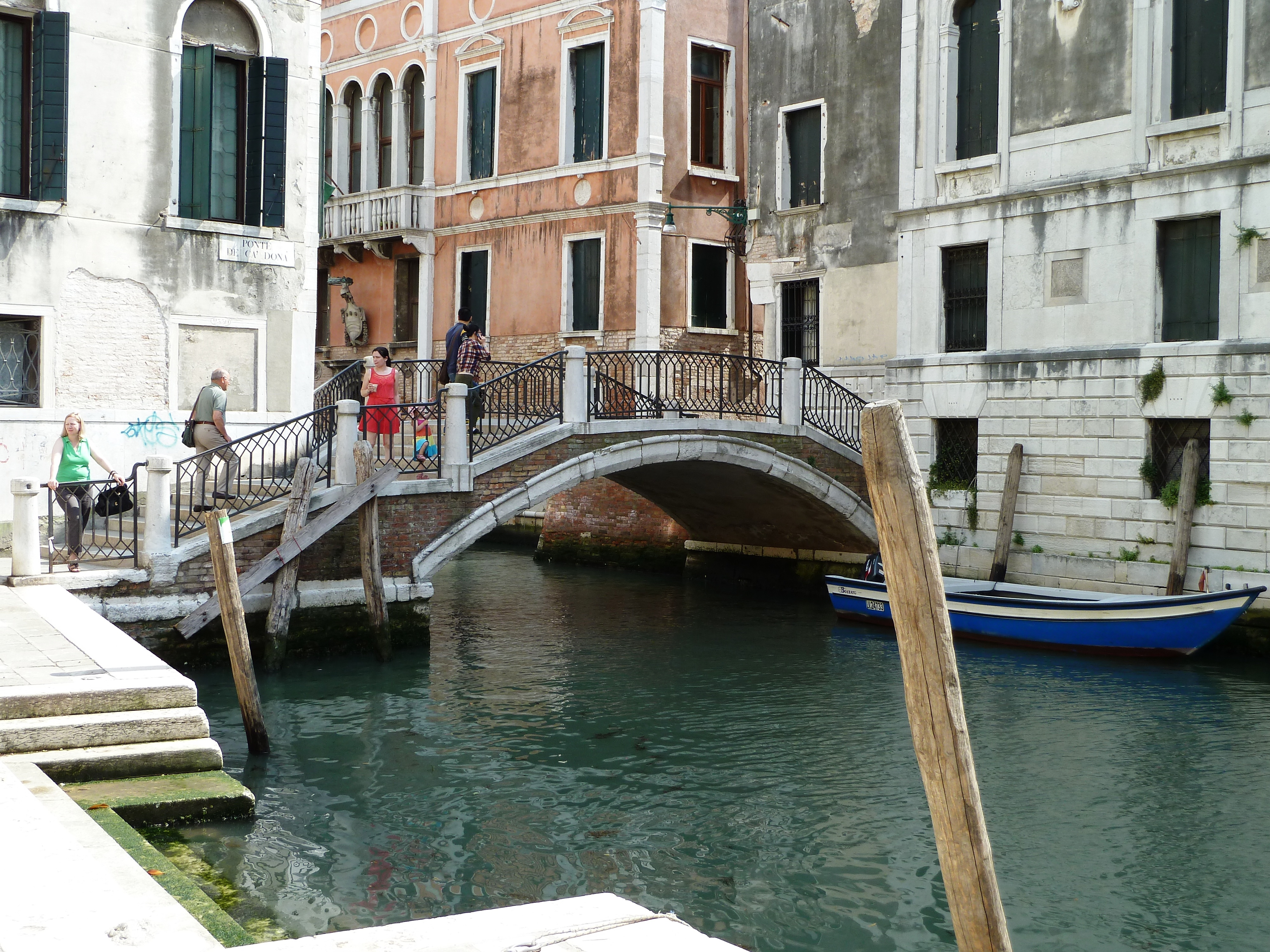
Ponte de Ca' Donà
Rio de Sant'Agostin

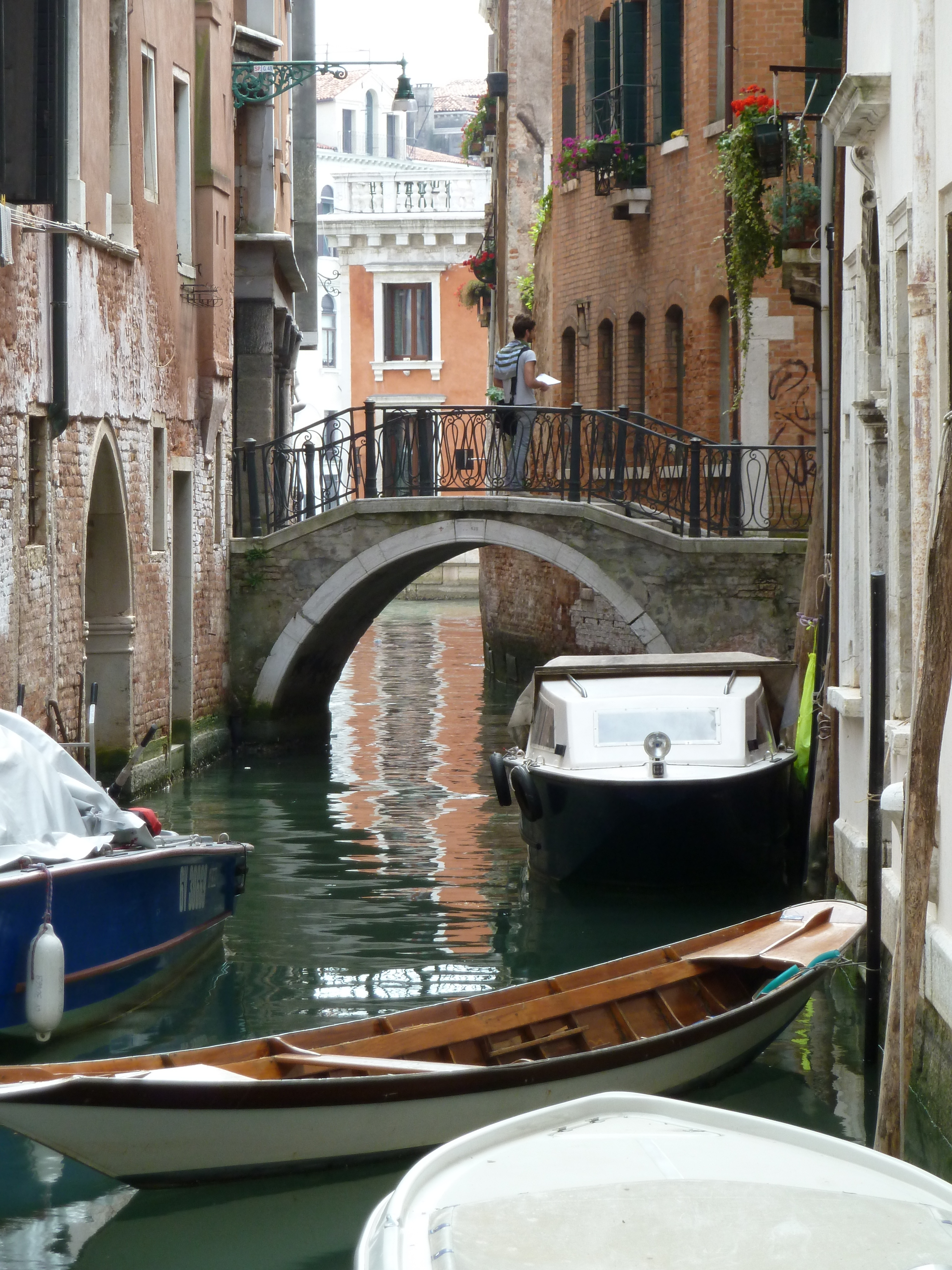
Ponte de Ca' Grimani
Rielo de le Erbe

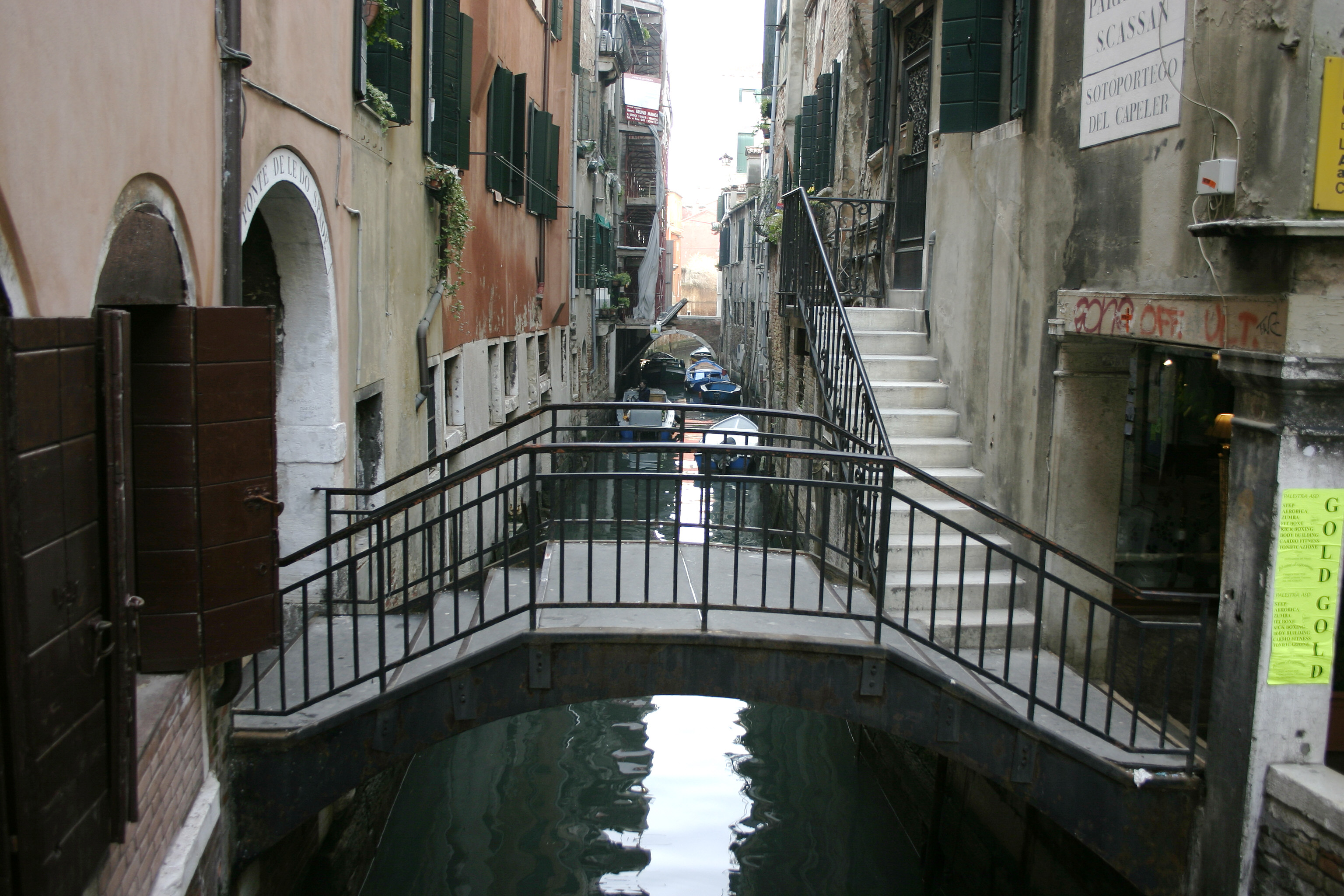
Ponte de le Do Spade
Rio de le Becarie

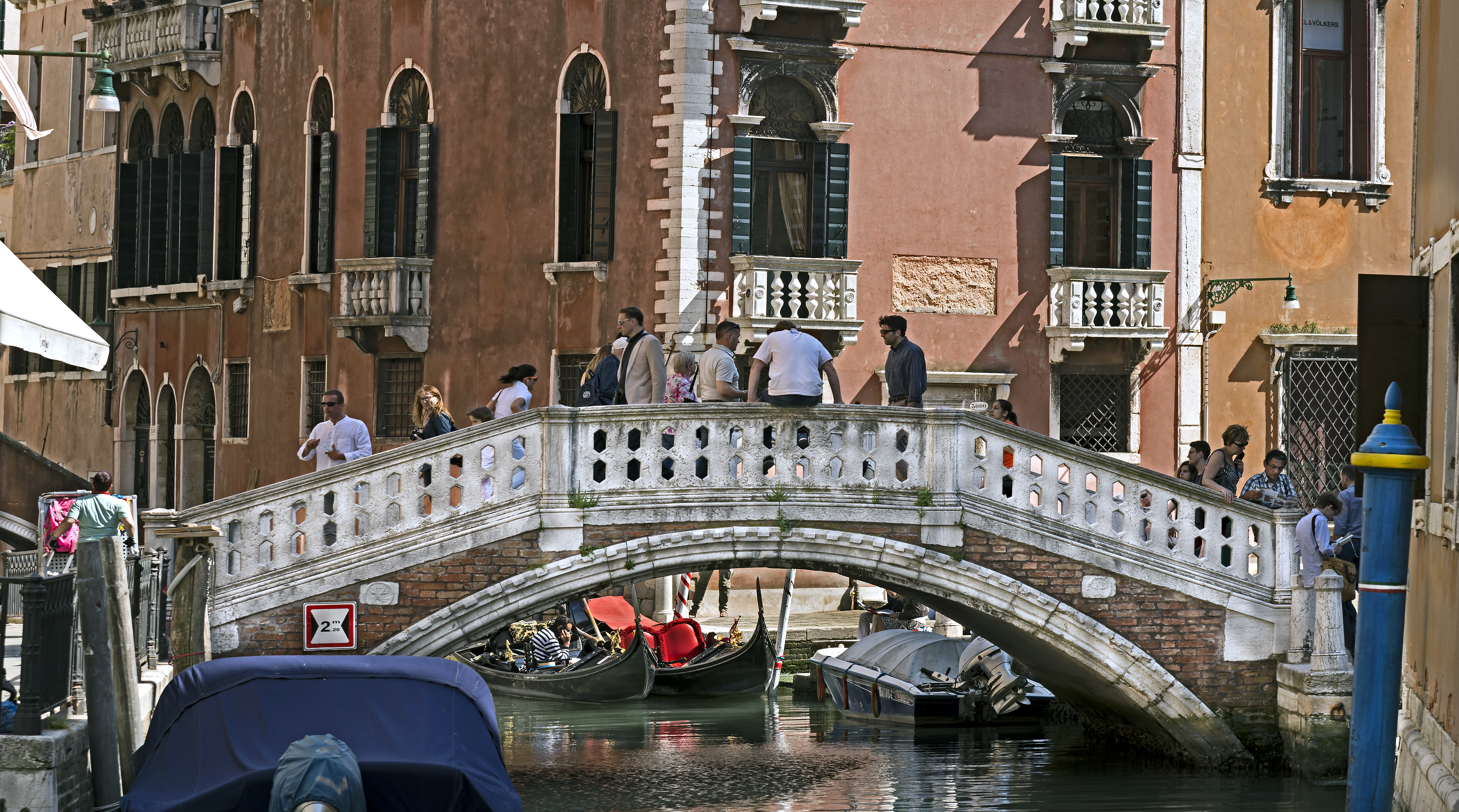
Ponte dei Frari
Rio dei Frari

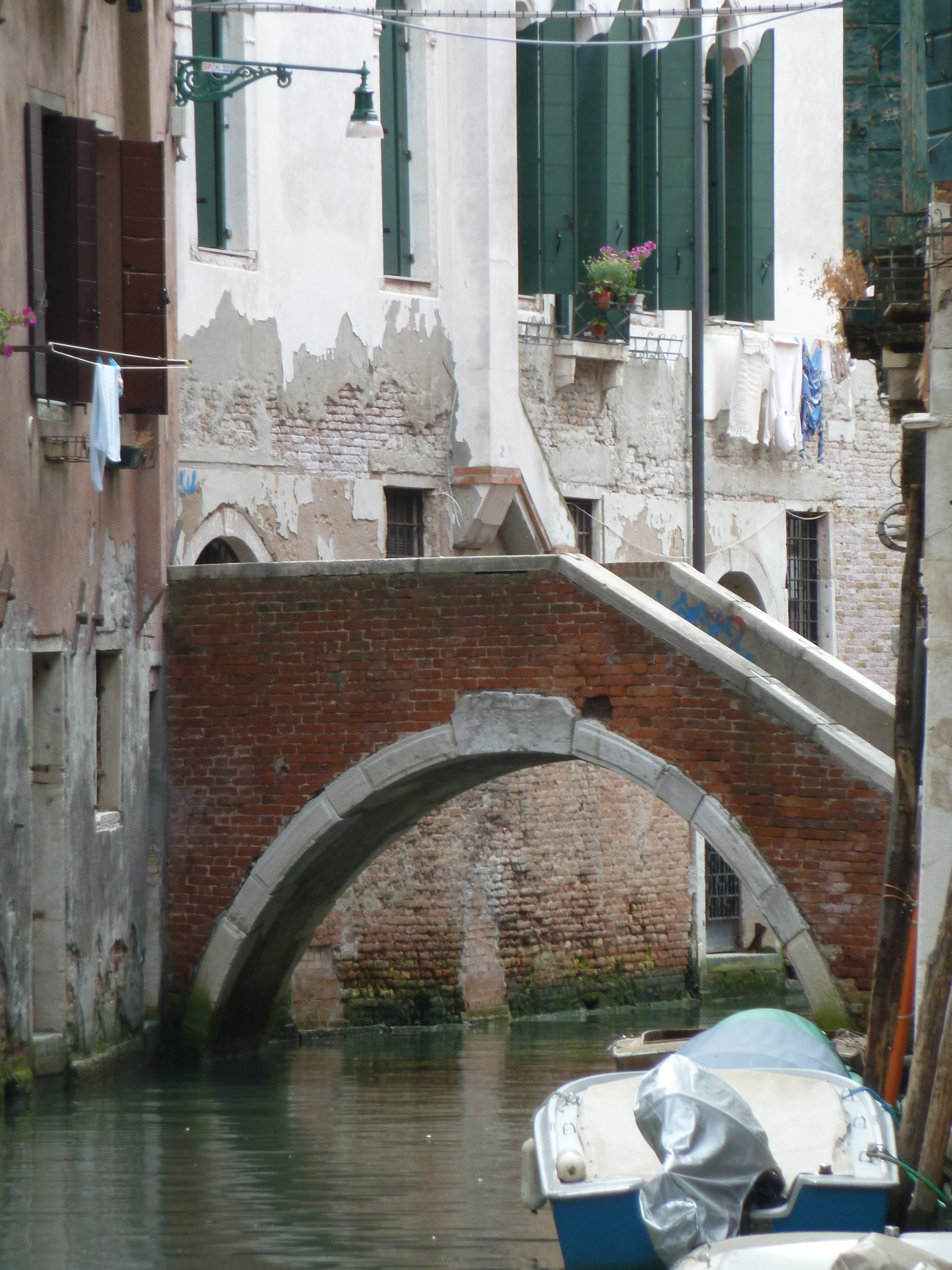
Ponte de la Furatola
Rio de le Becarie

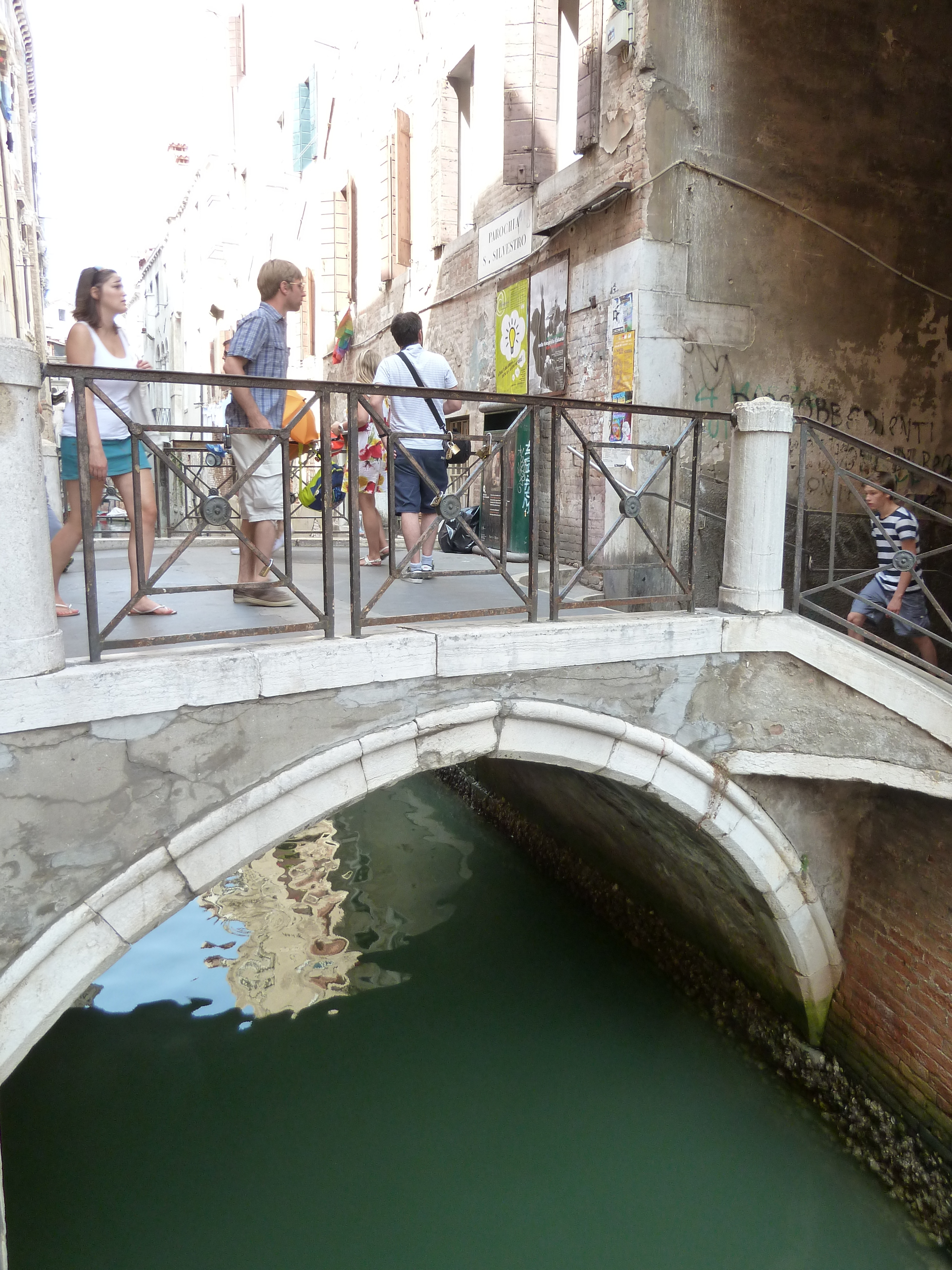
Ponte de la Madoneta, Rio de la Madoneta

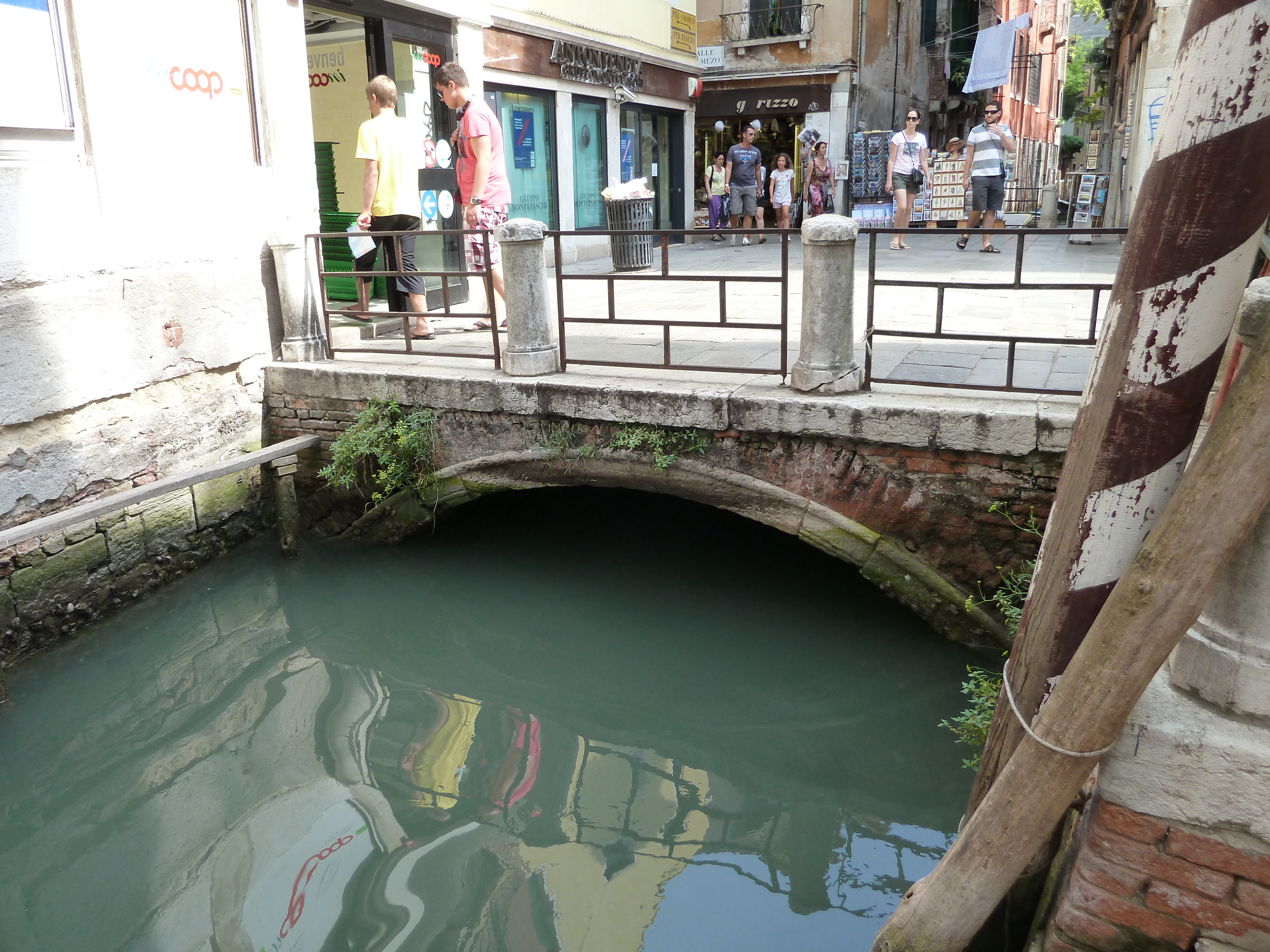
Ponte Piano dei Meloni
Rio dei Meloni

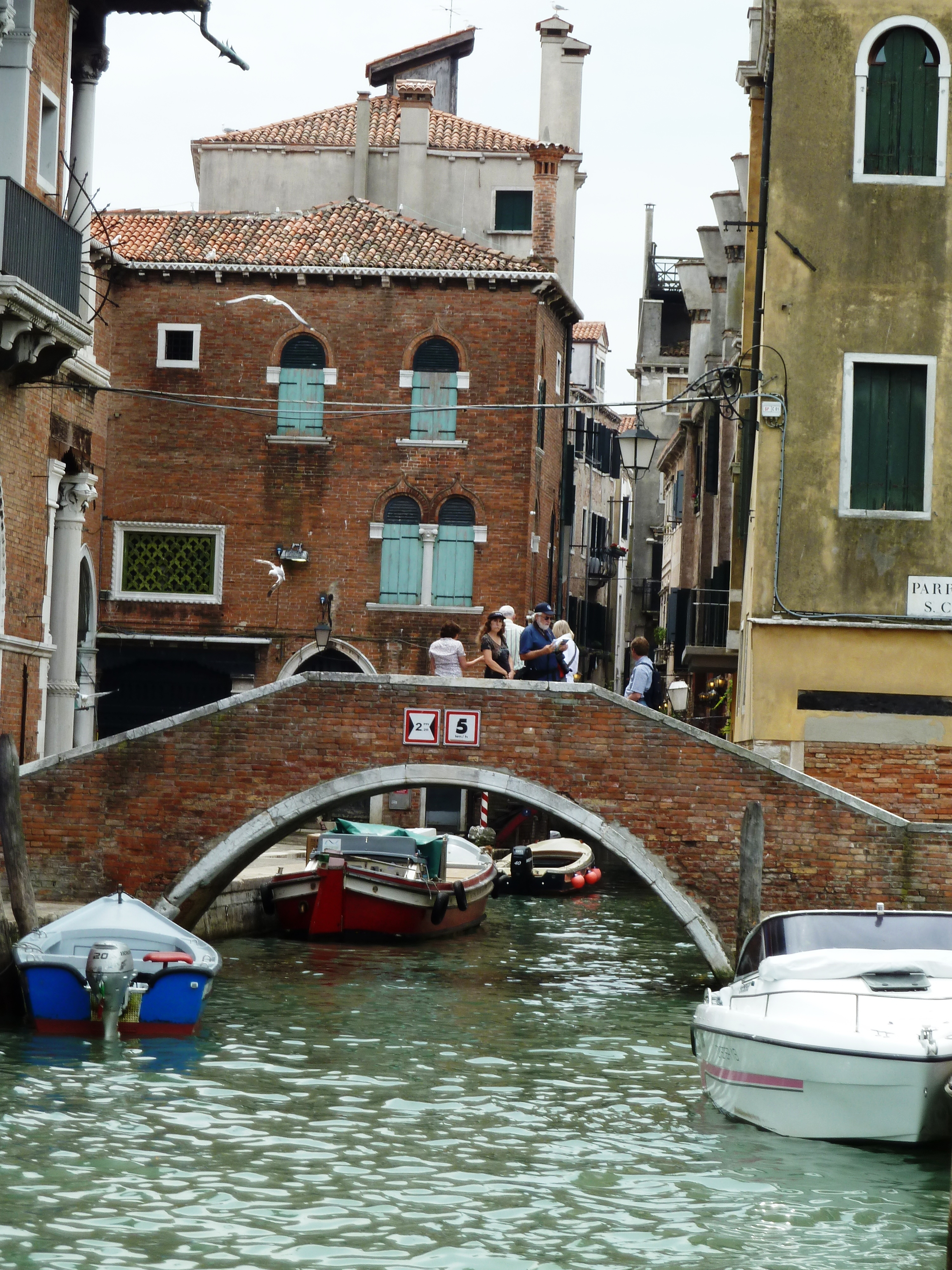
Ponte de la Pescaria
Rio de le Becarie

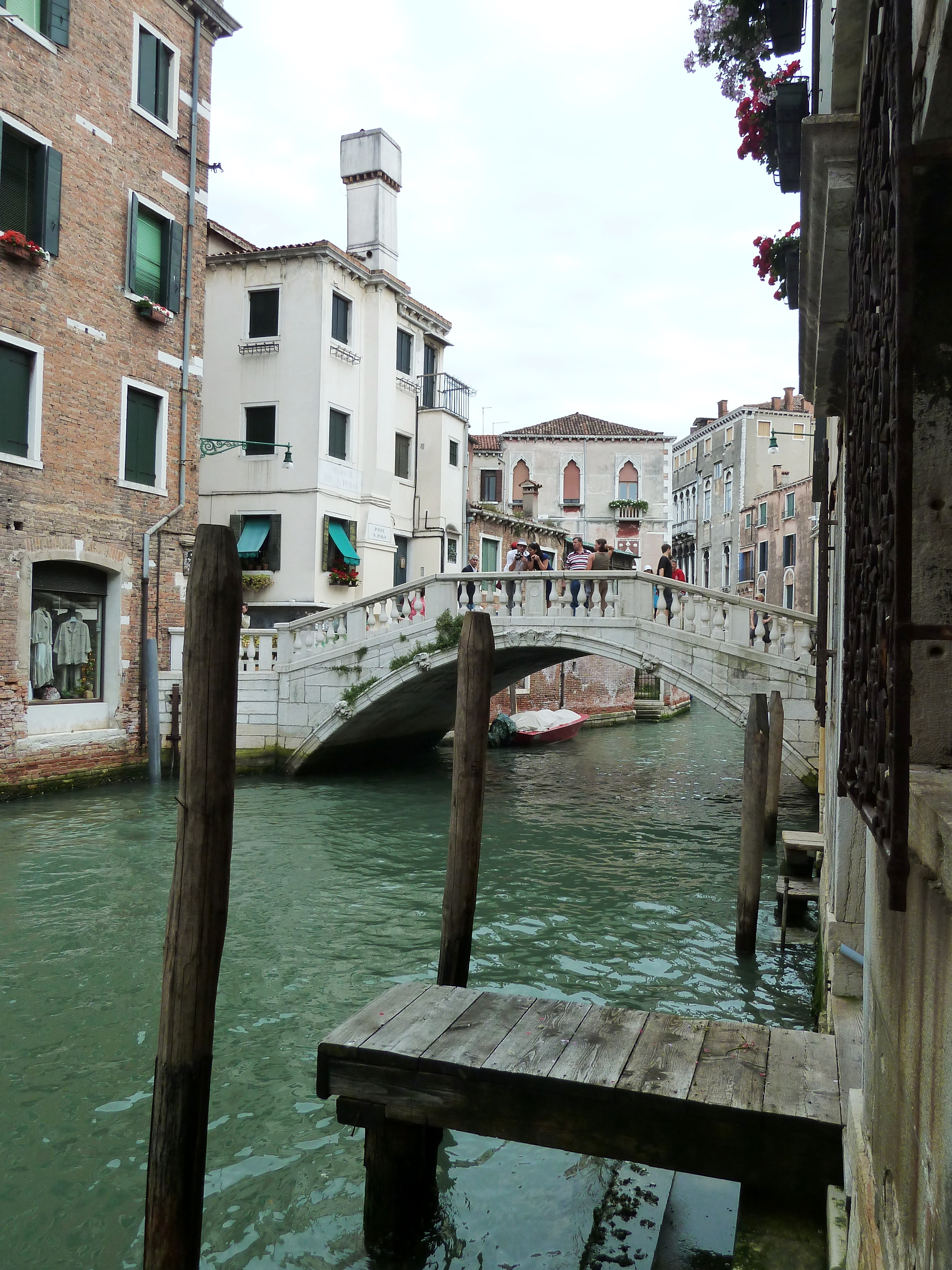
Ponte San Polo
Rio de San Polo

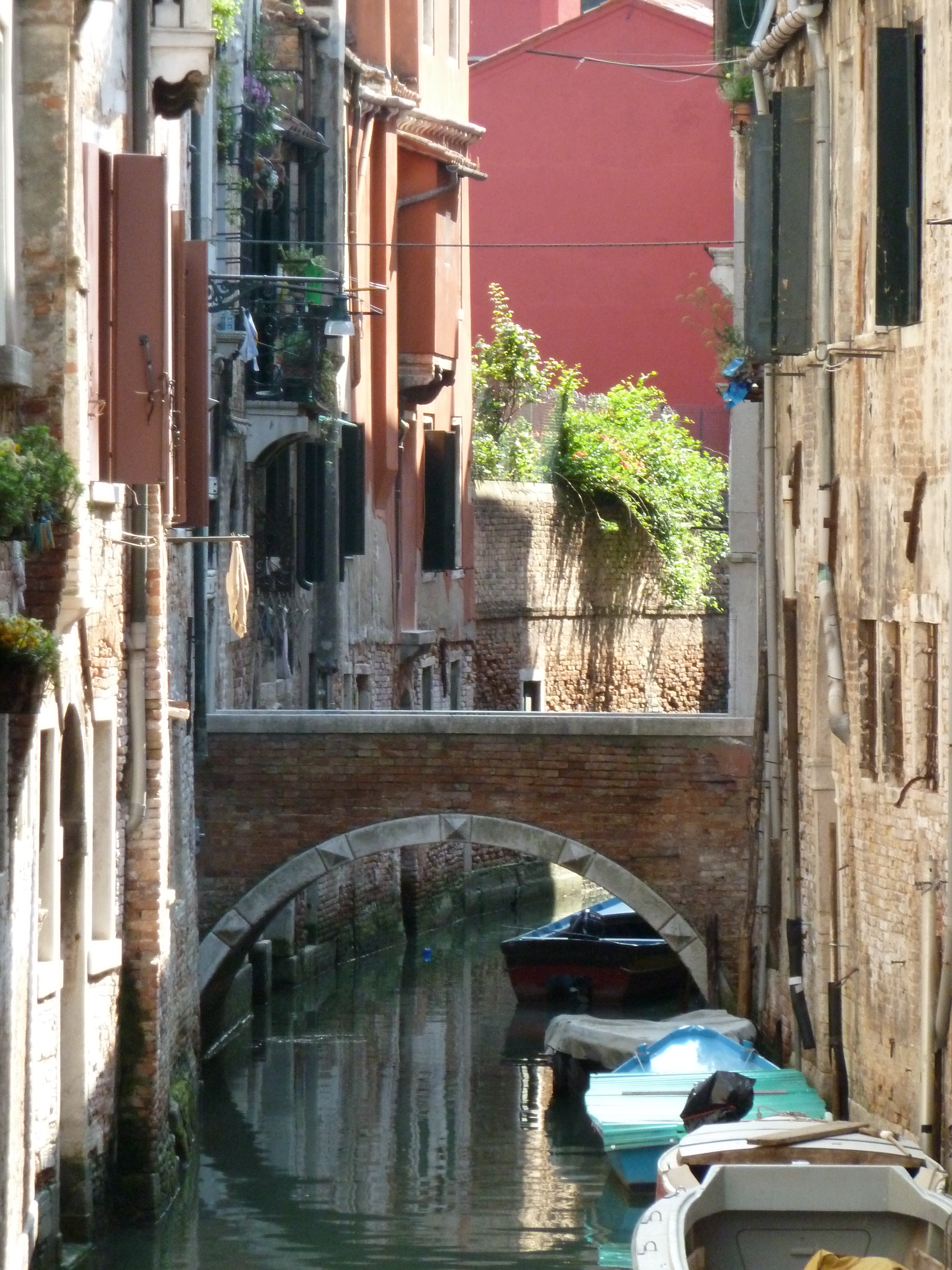
Ponte Raspi ou Sansoni
Rio de le Becarie

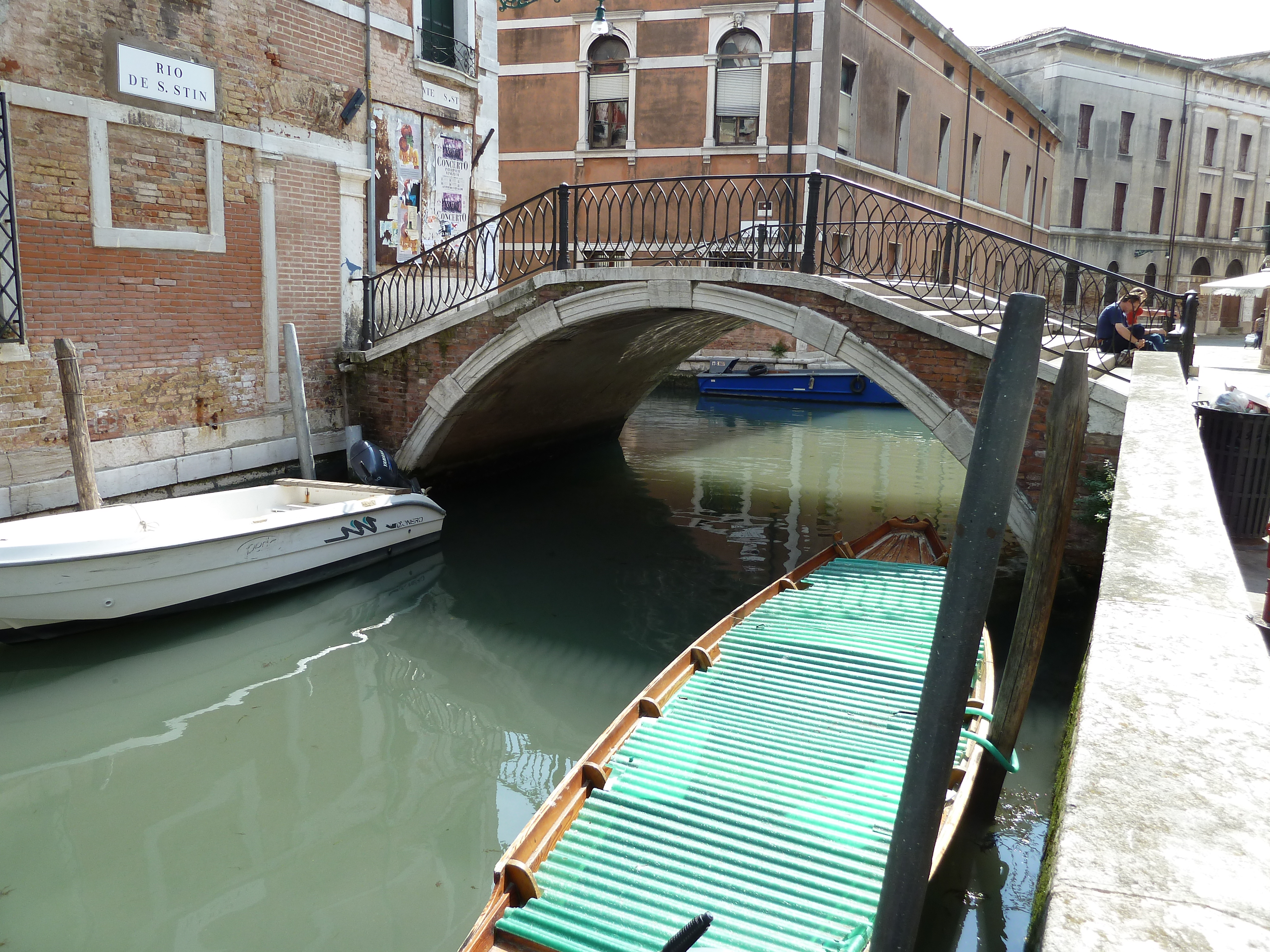
Ponte San Stin
Rio de San Stin

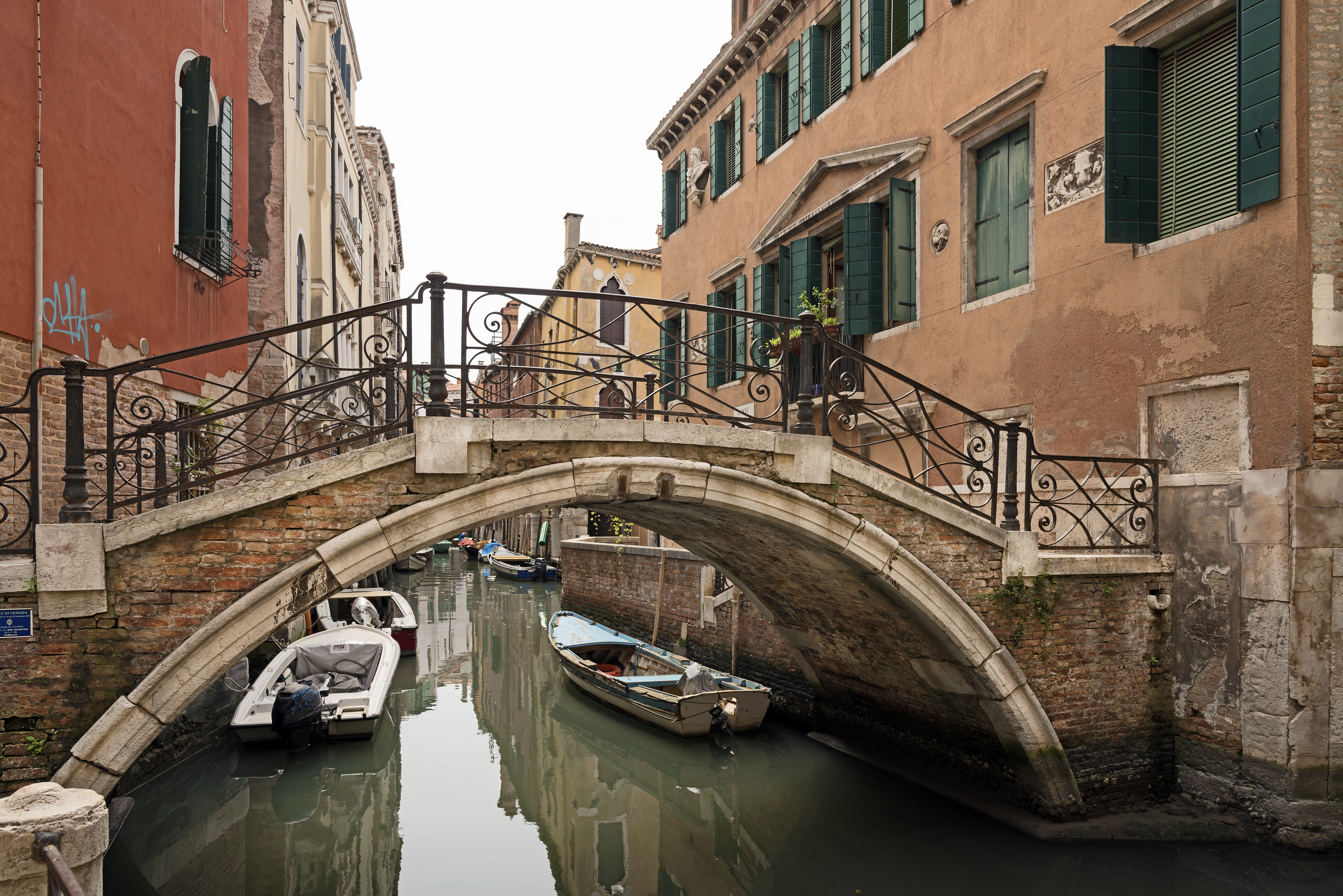
Ponte Storto
Rio de San Aponal

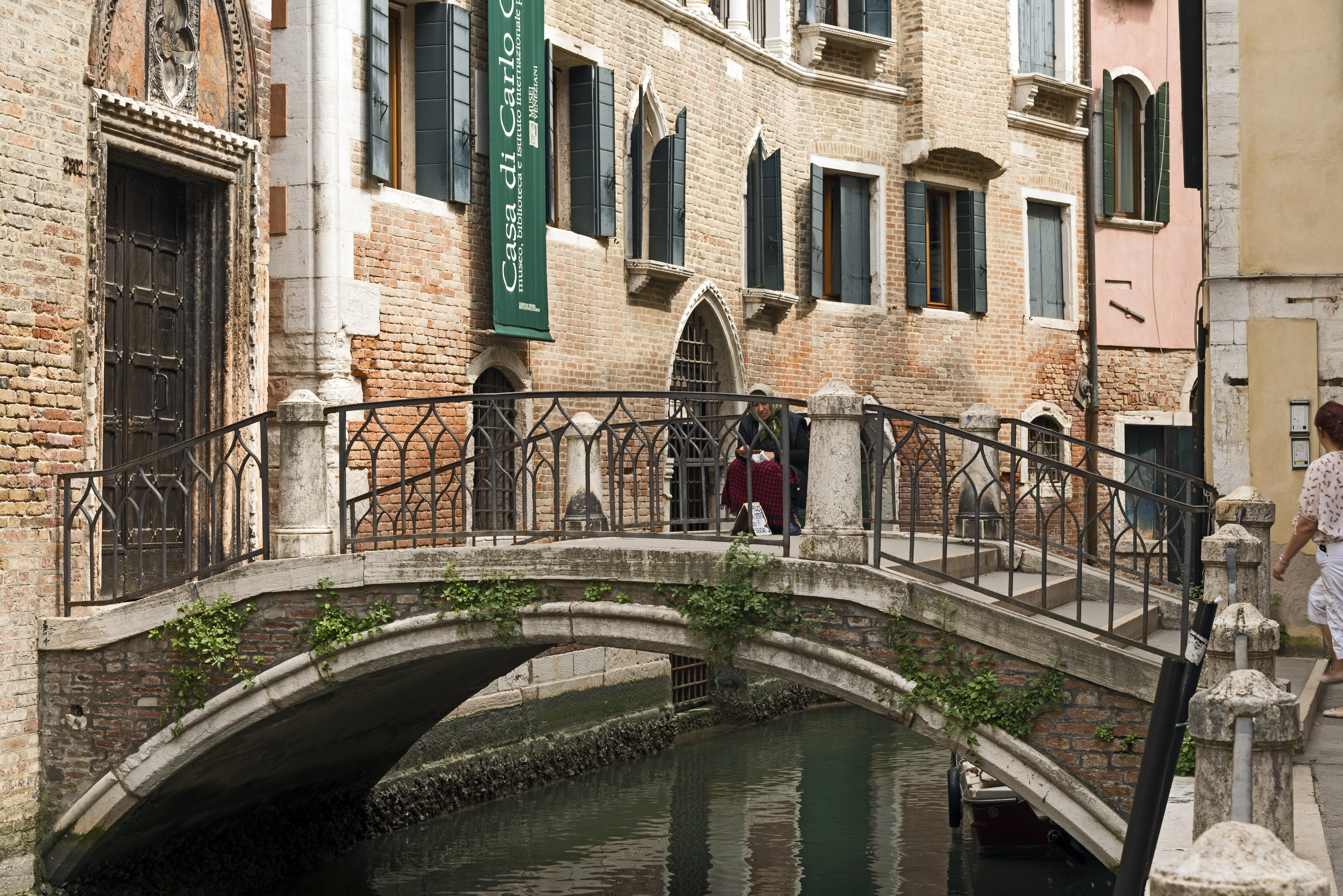
Ponte San Tomà
Rio di San Tomà

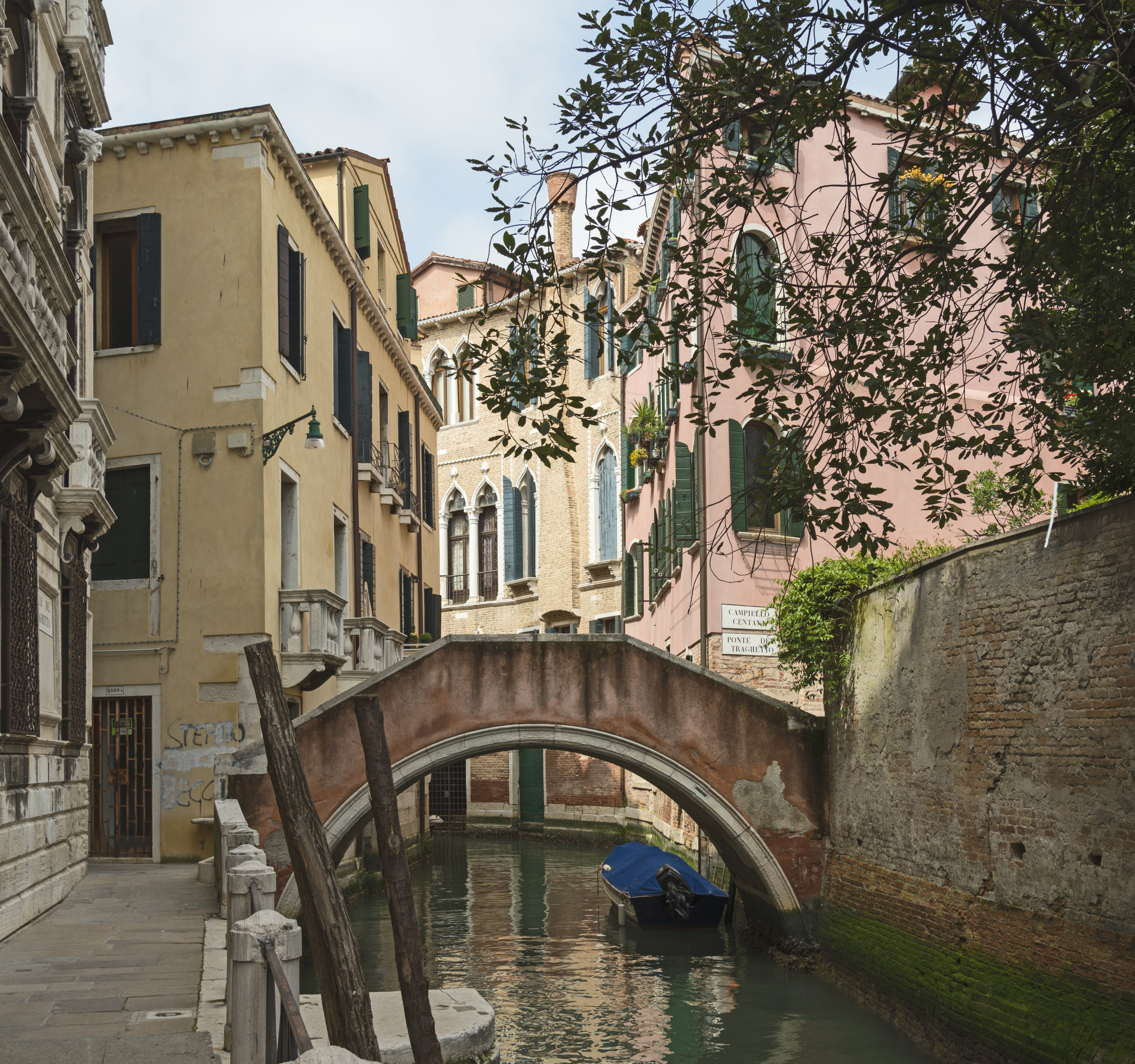
Ponte del Traghetto/Centani
Rio de San Tomà
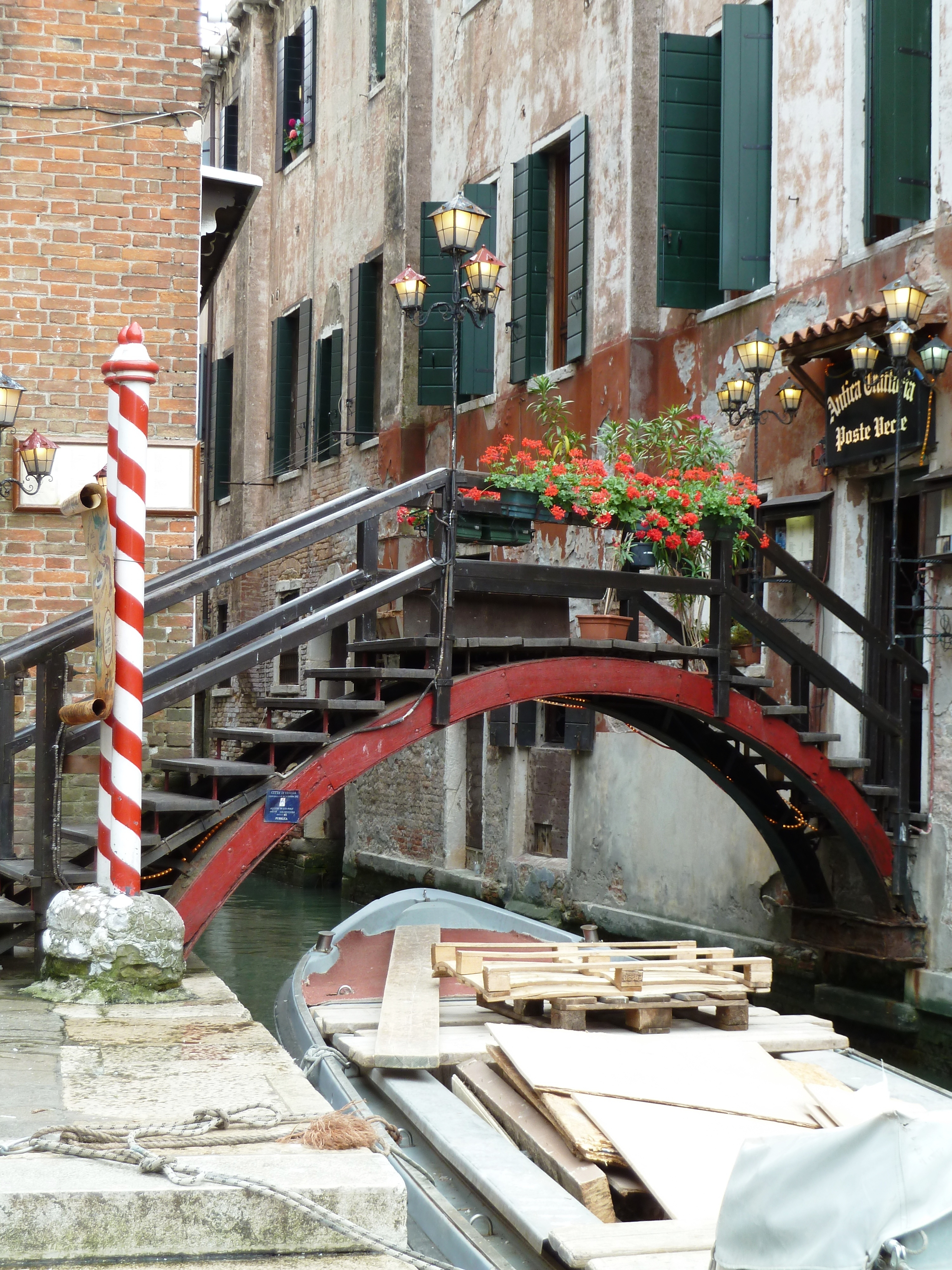
private bridge of the Poste Vecie,
Rio de le Becarie

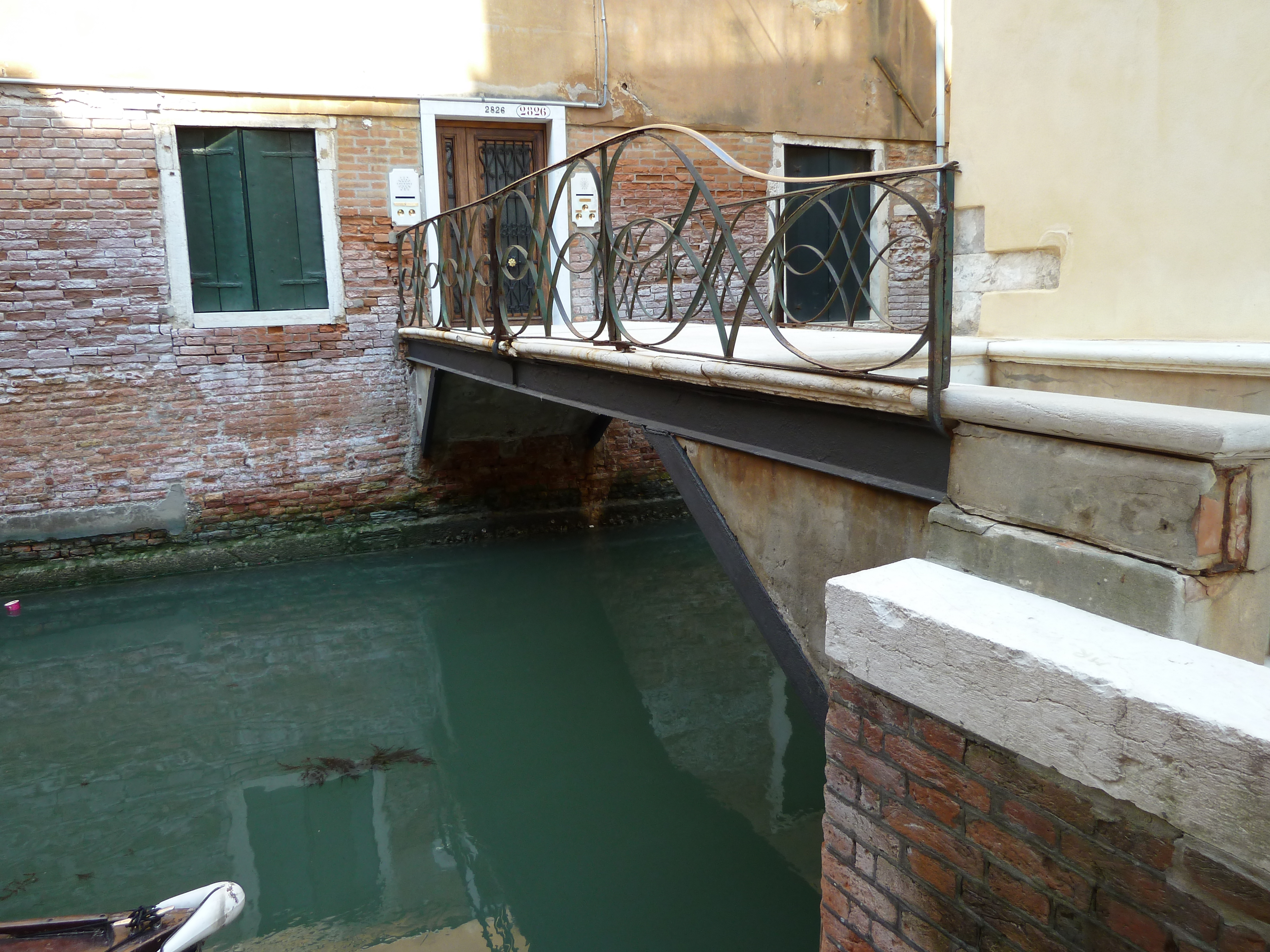
private bridge No. 2826
Rio di San Tomà

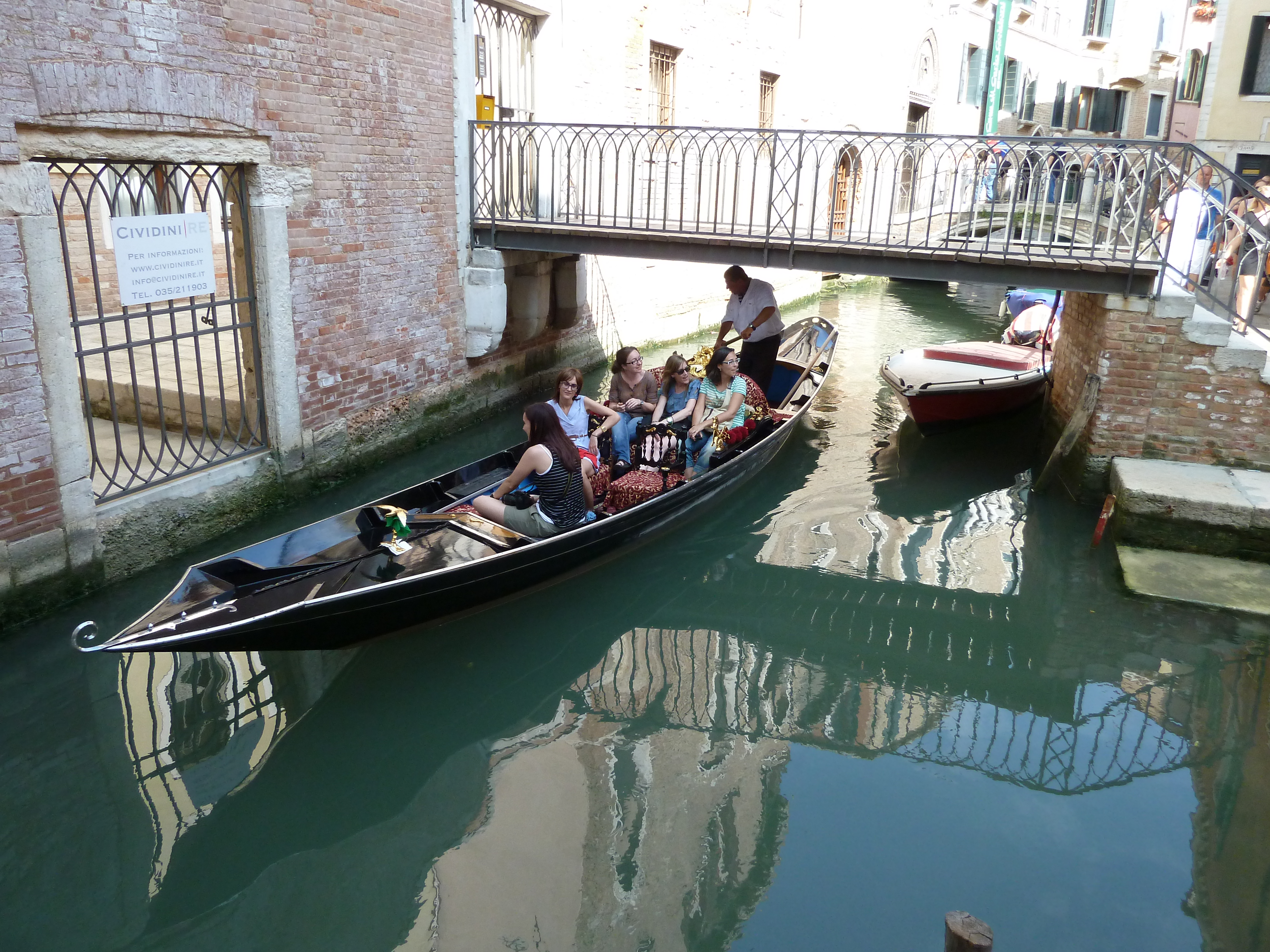
private bridge
Rio di San Tomà

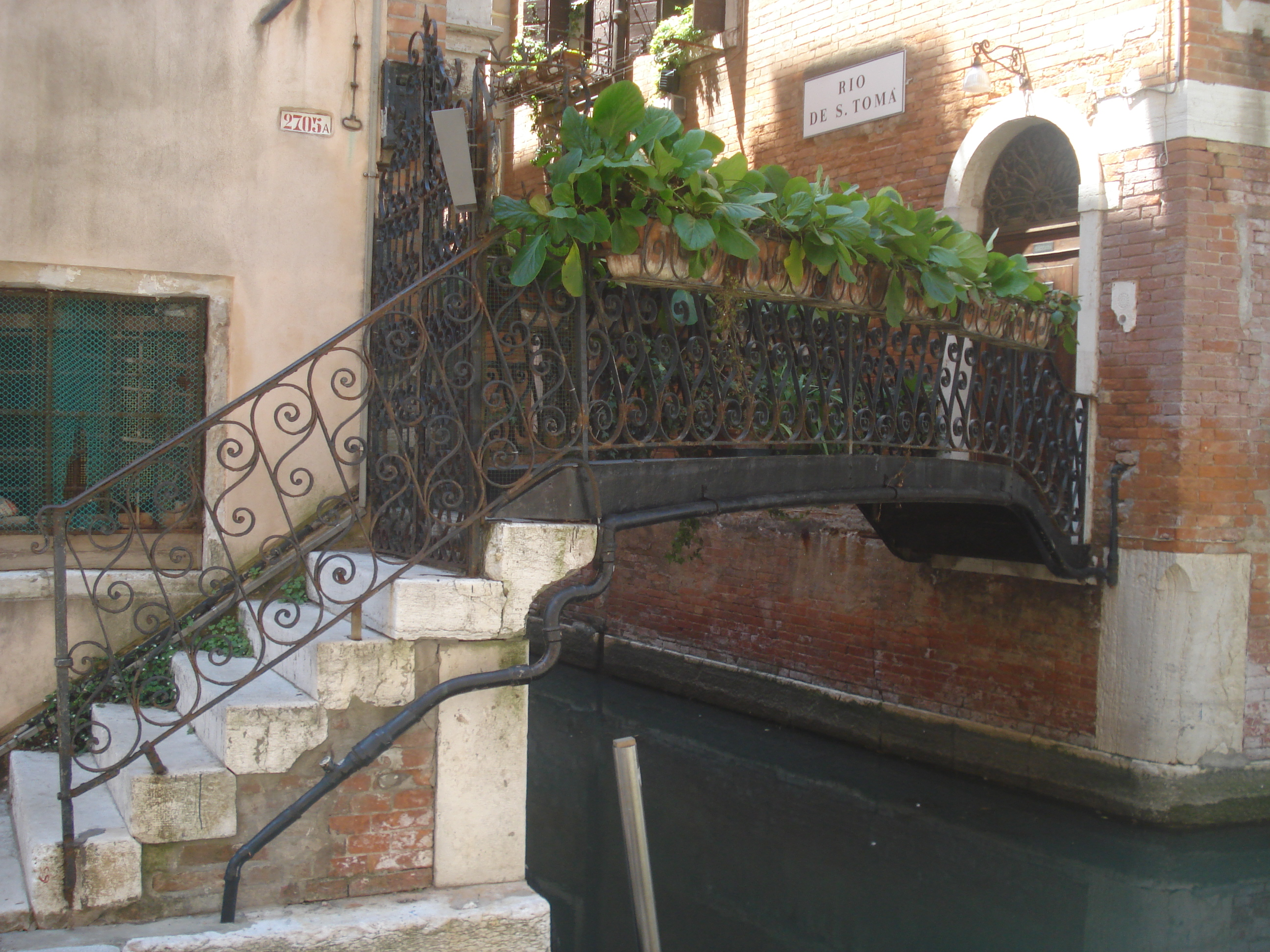
pprivate bridge No. 2705/A
Rio di San Tomà

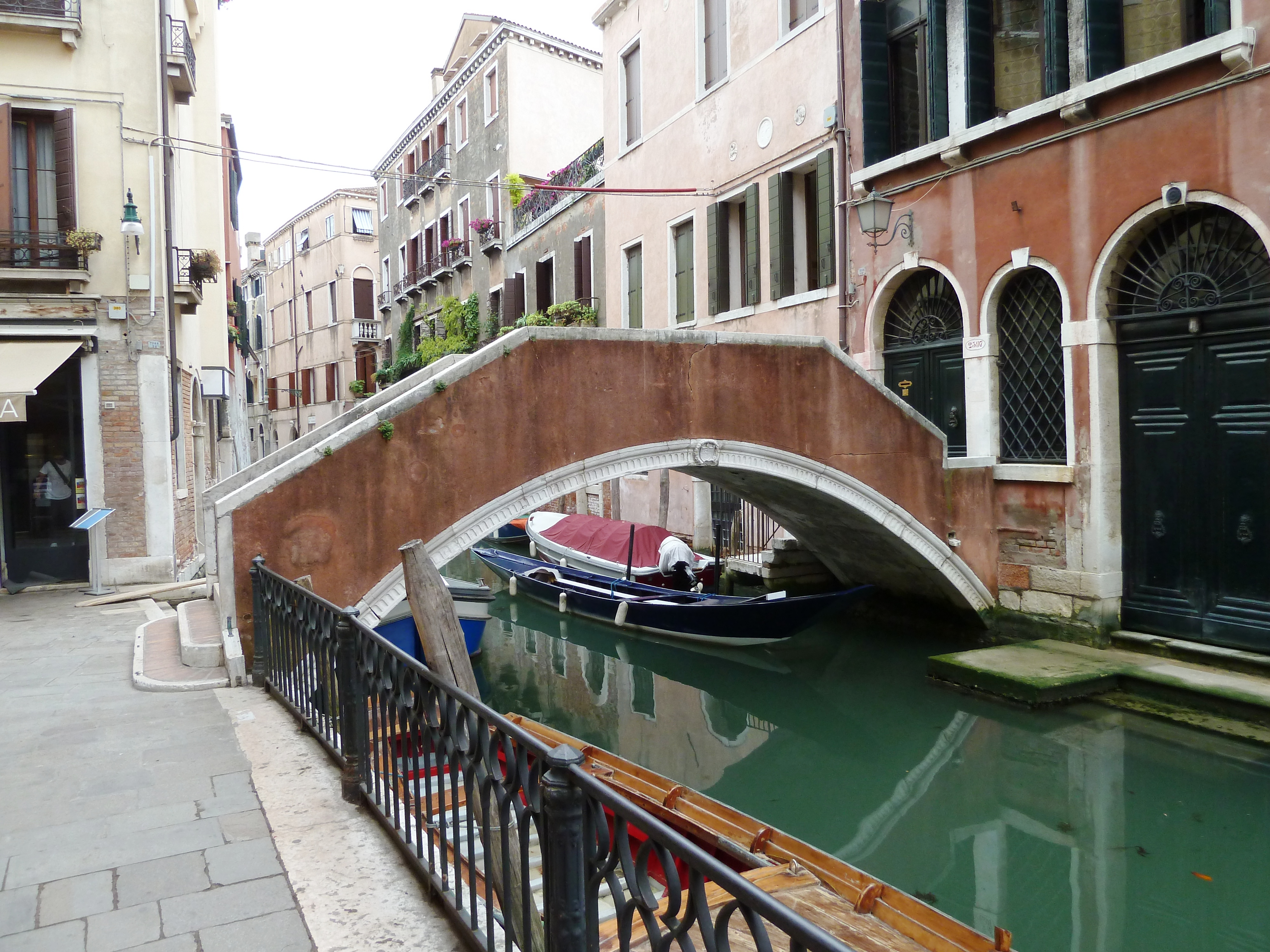
private bridge No. 2597
Rio dei Frari

=== Border San Polo-Dorsoduro ===
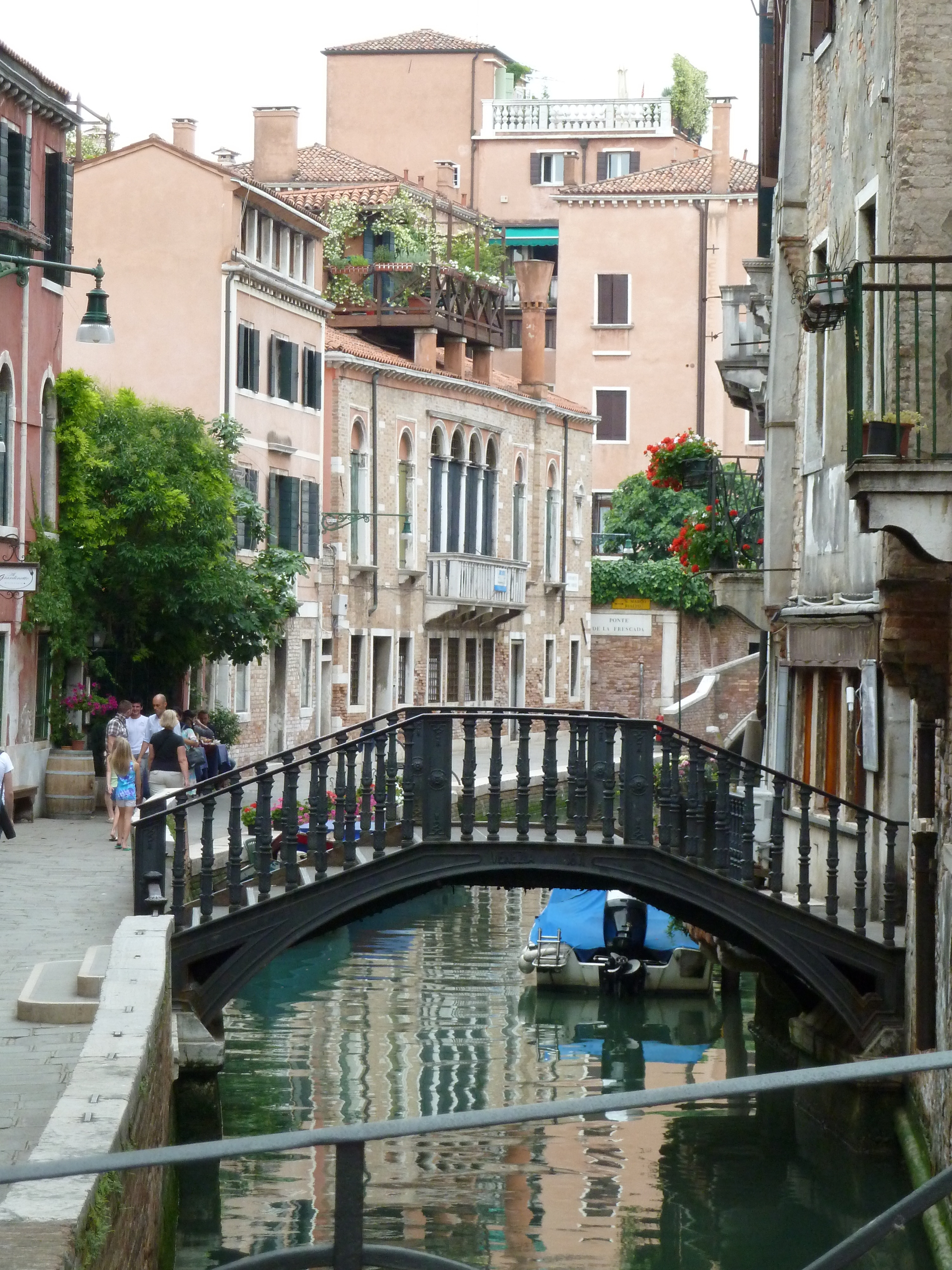
Ponte de la Donna Onesta
Rio de la Frescada

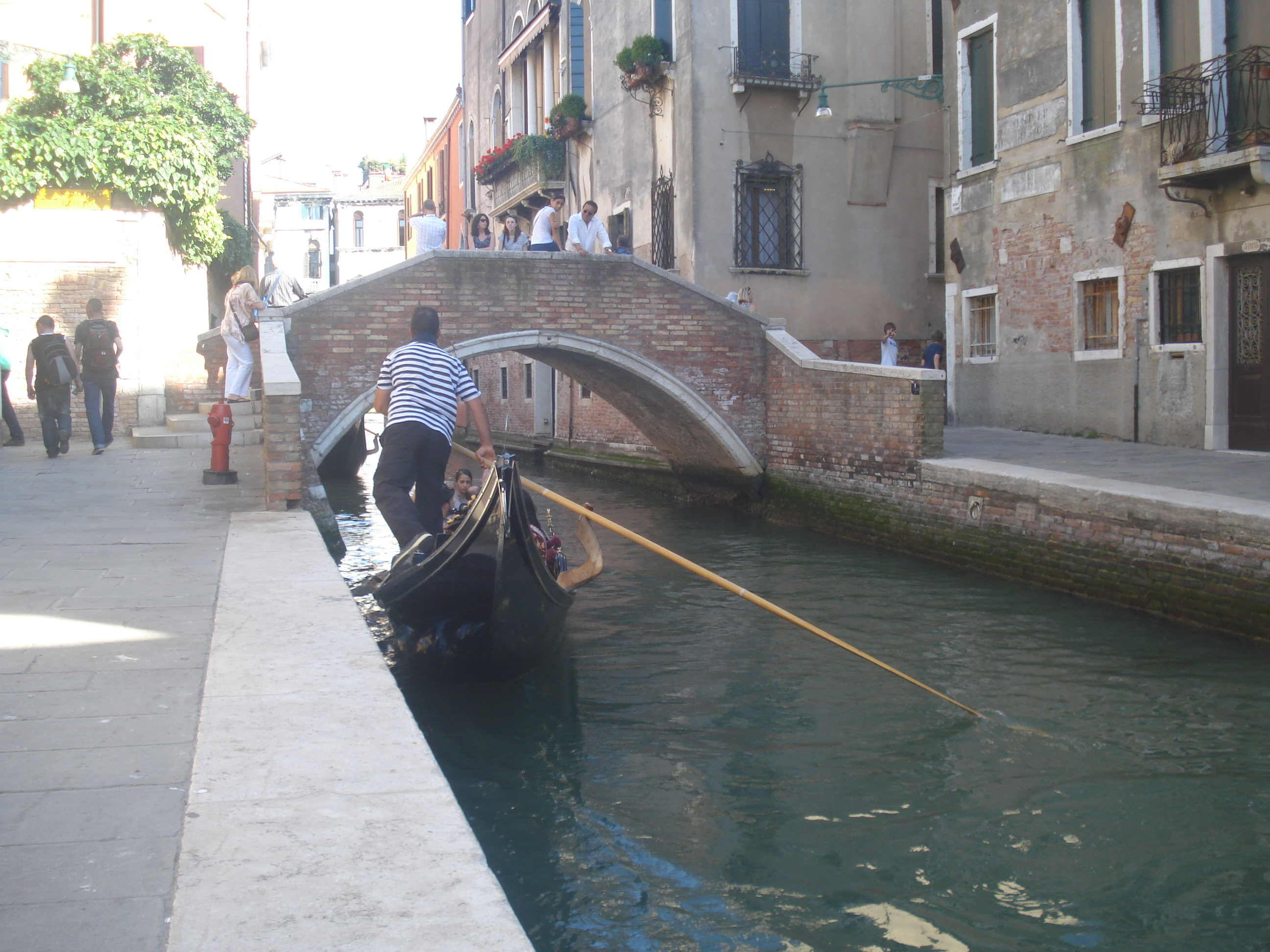
Ponte de la Frescada
Rio de la Frescada

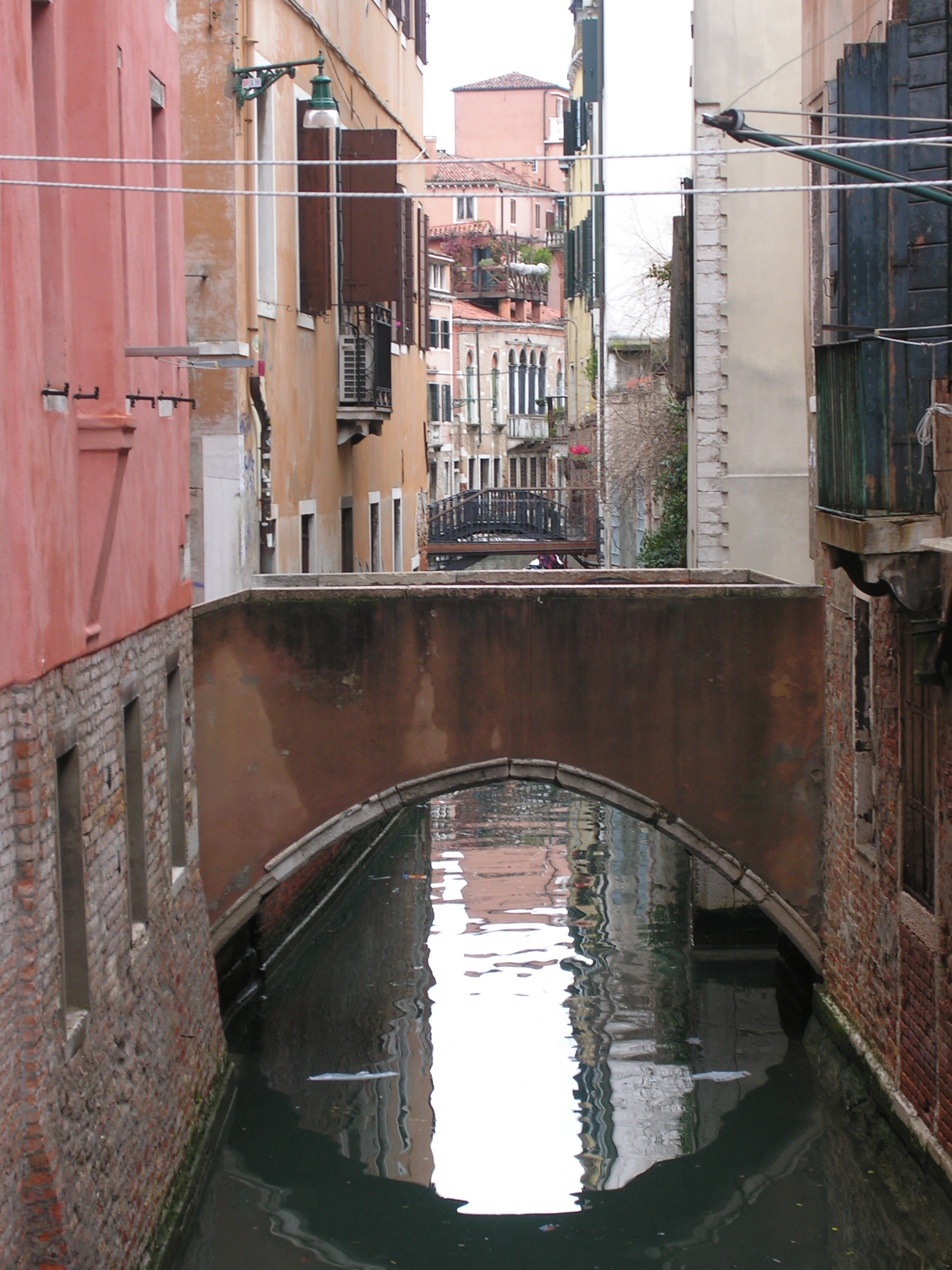
Ponte San Rocco
Rio de la Frescada

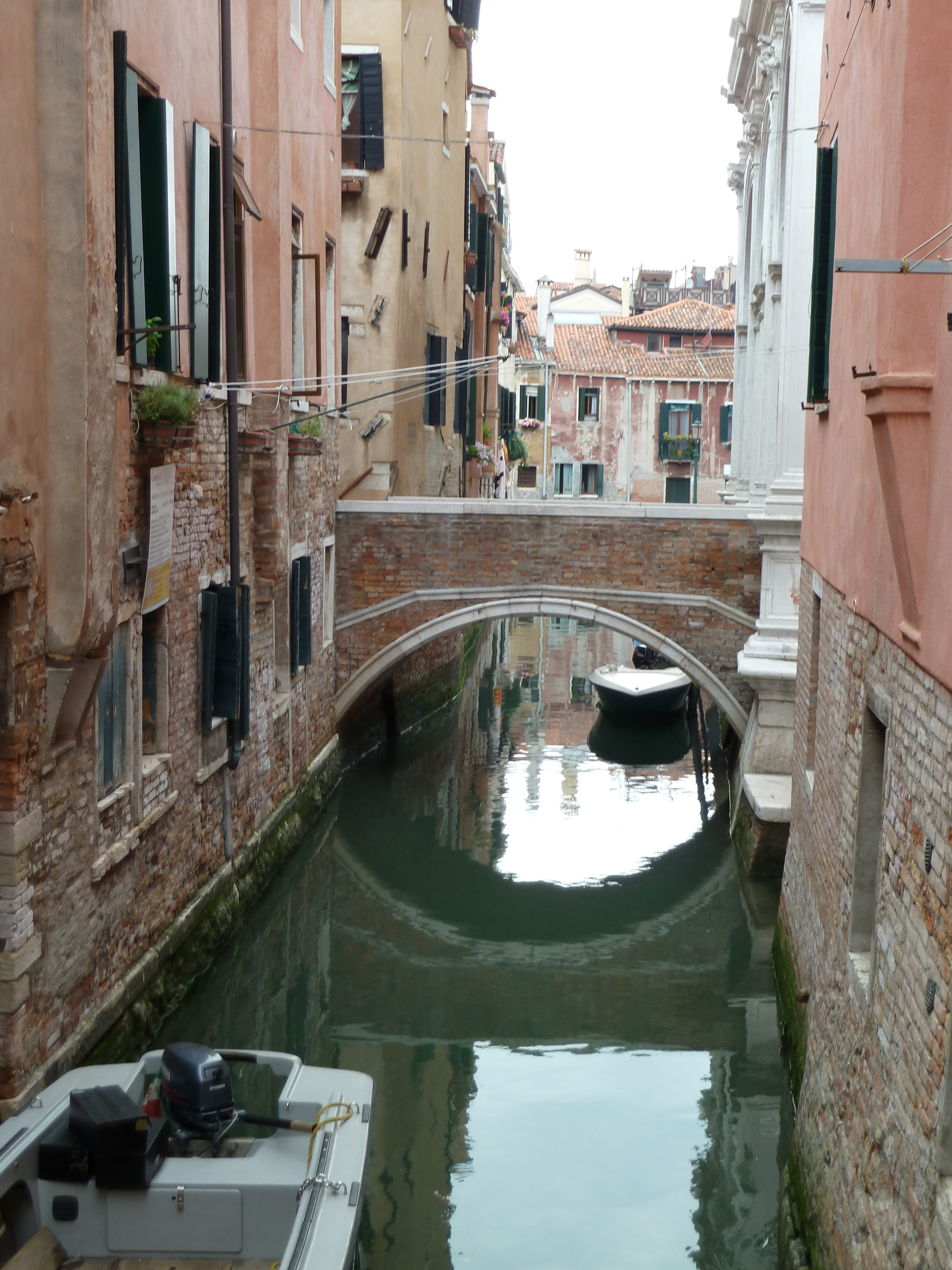
Ponte de la Scuola
Rio de la Frescada

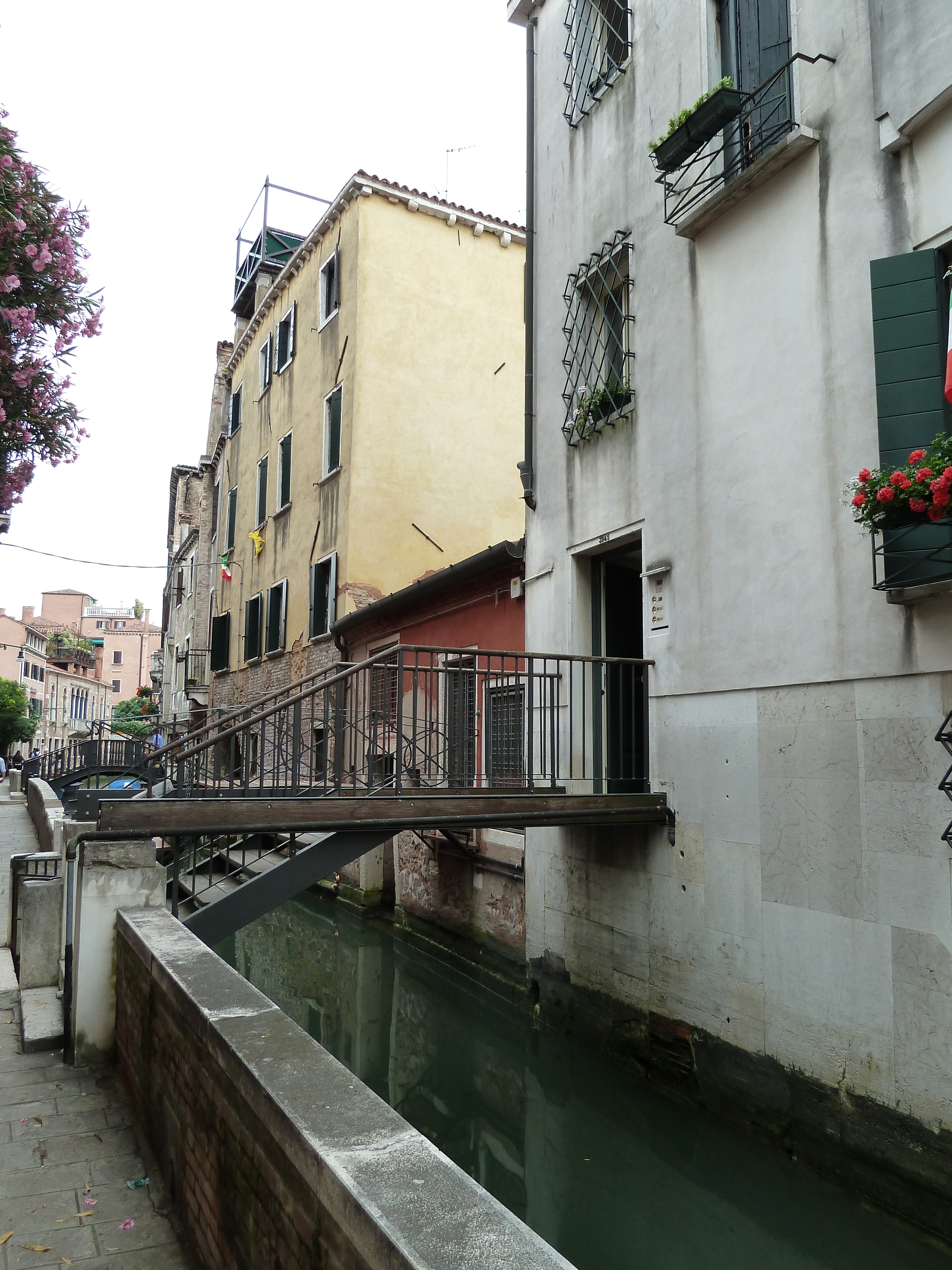
private bridge
Rio de la Frescada

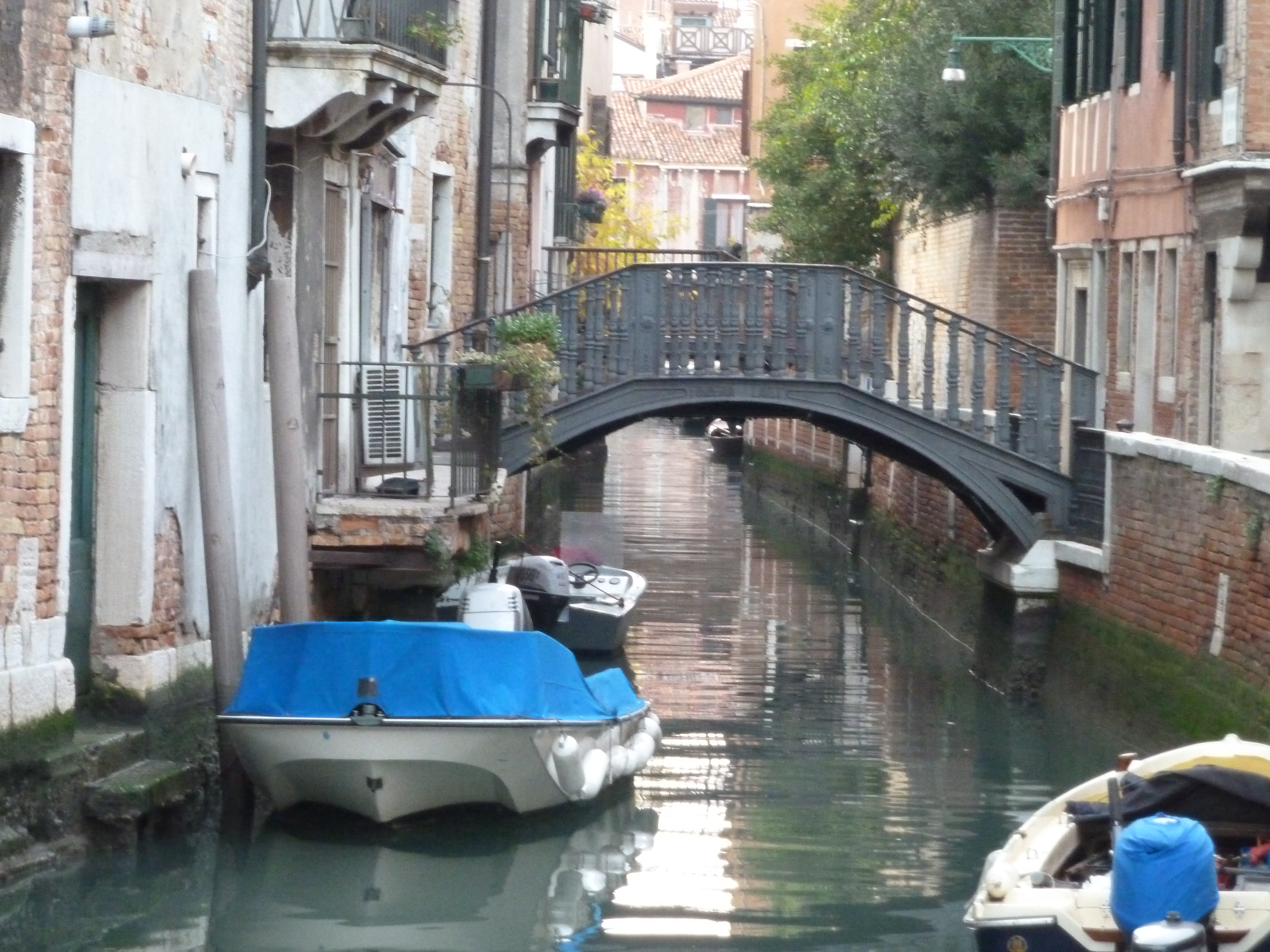
private bridge
Rio de la Frescada

== Sestieri of Dorsoduro ==
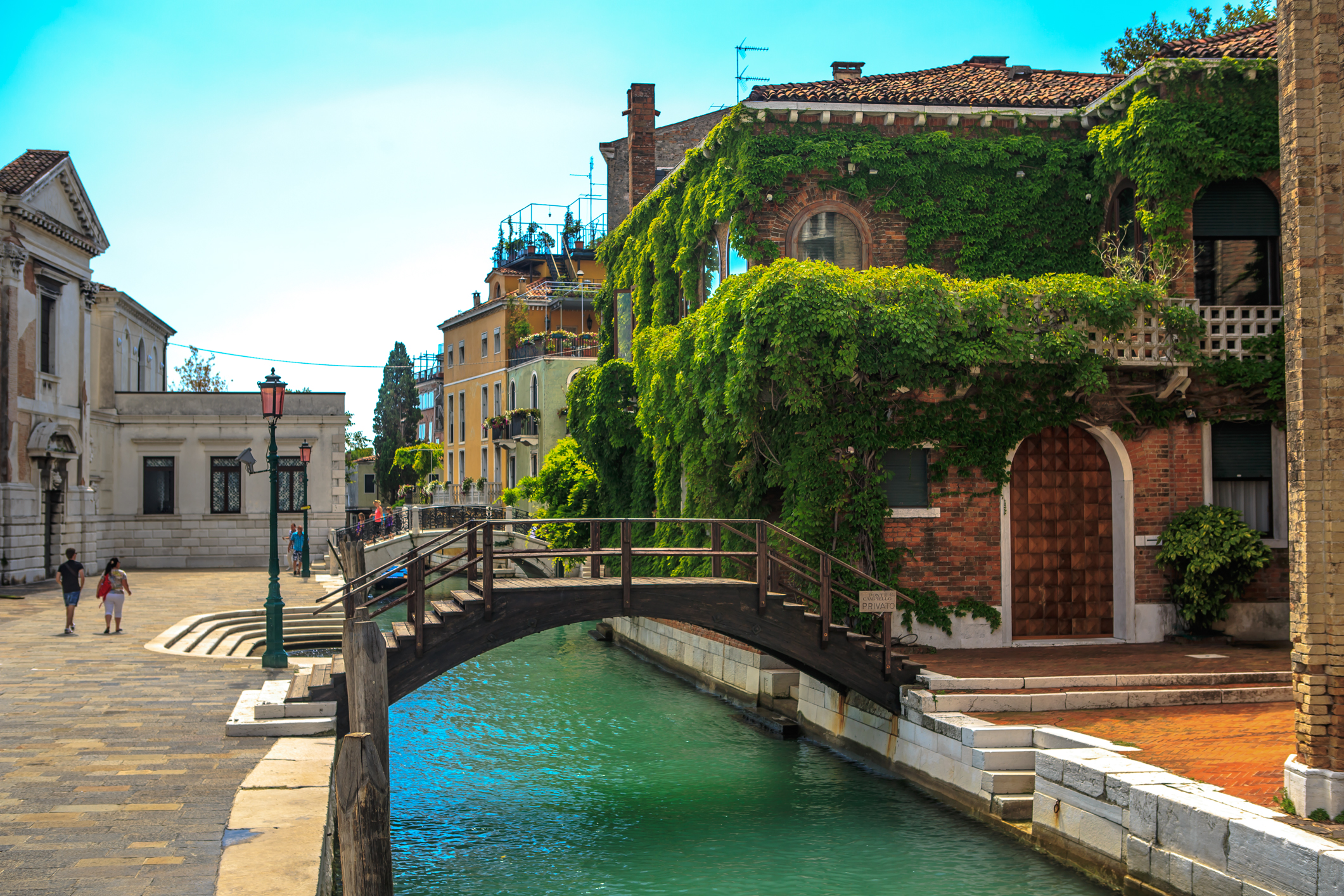
Ponte de l'Abazia
Rio della Salute

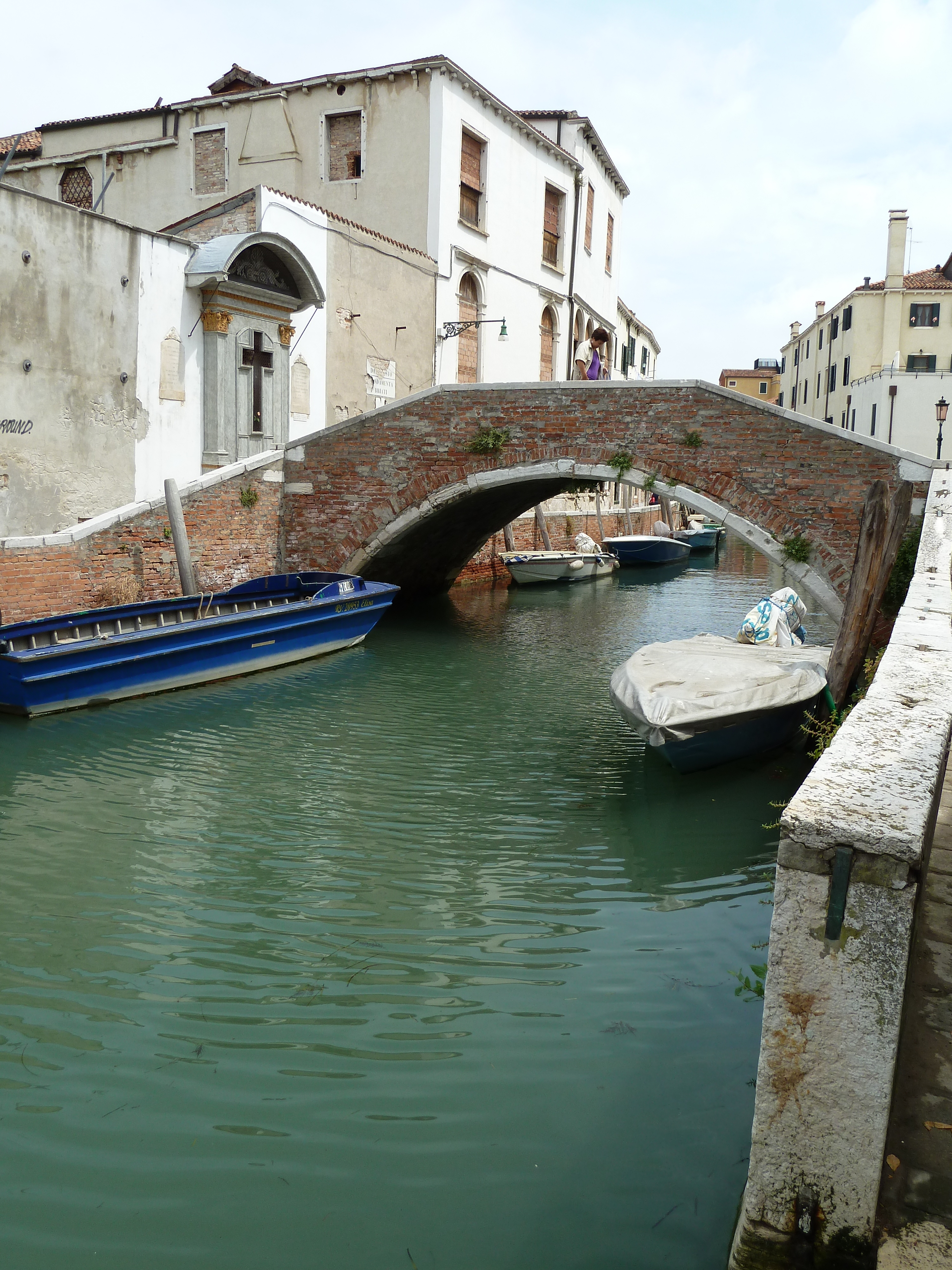
Ponte de l'Anzolo
Rio de l'Anzolo Rafael

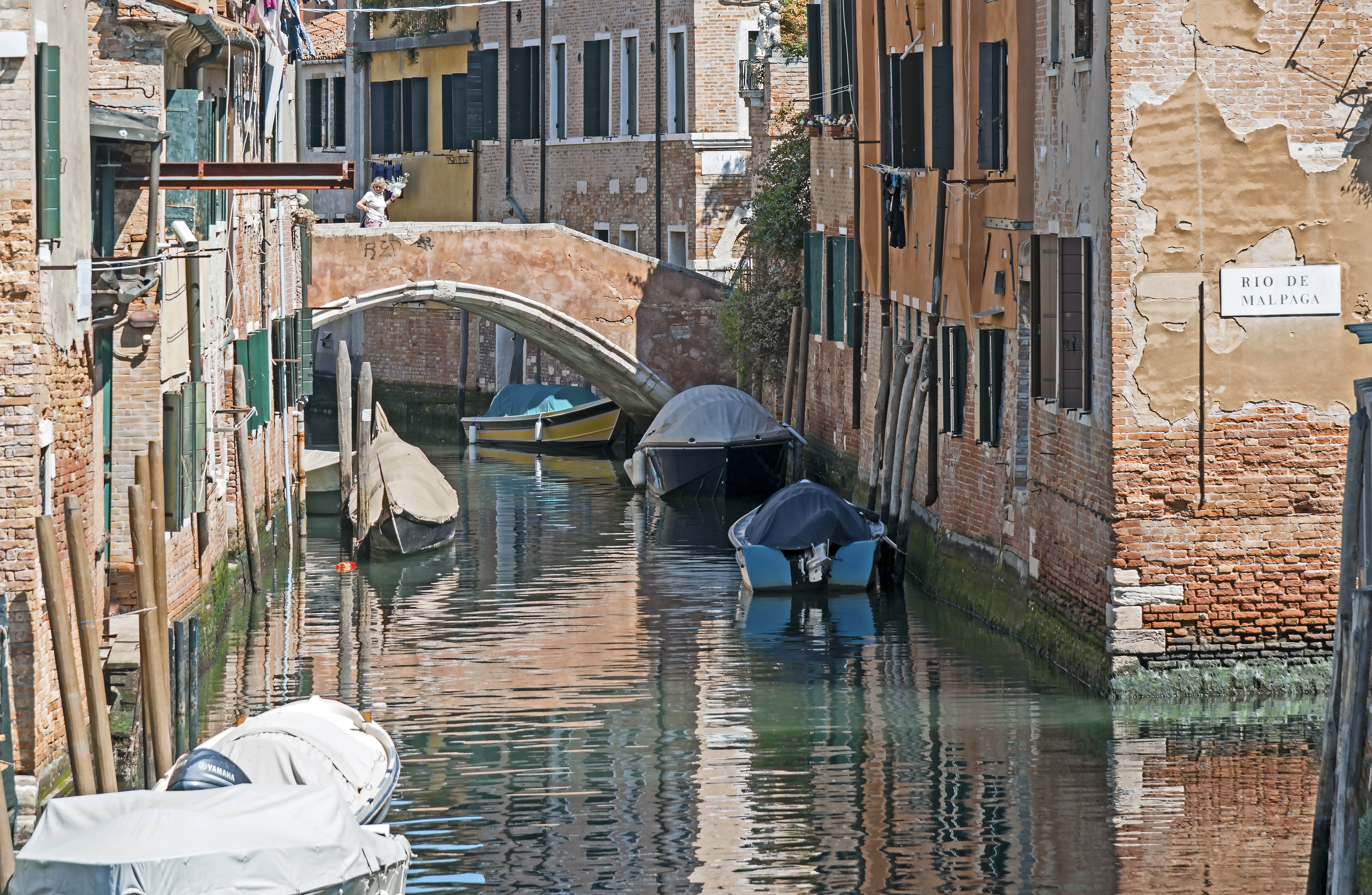
Ponte de l'Avogaria
Rio de l'Avogaria

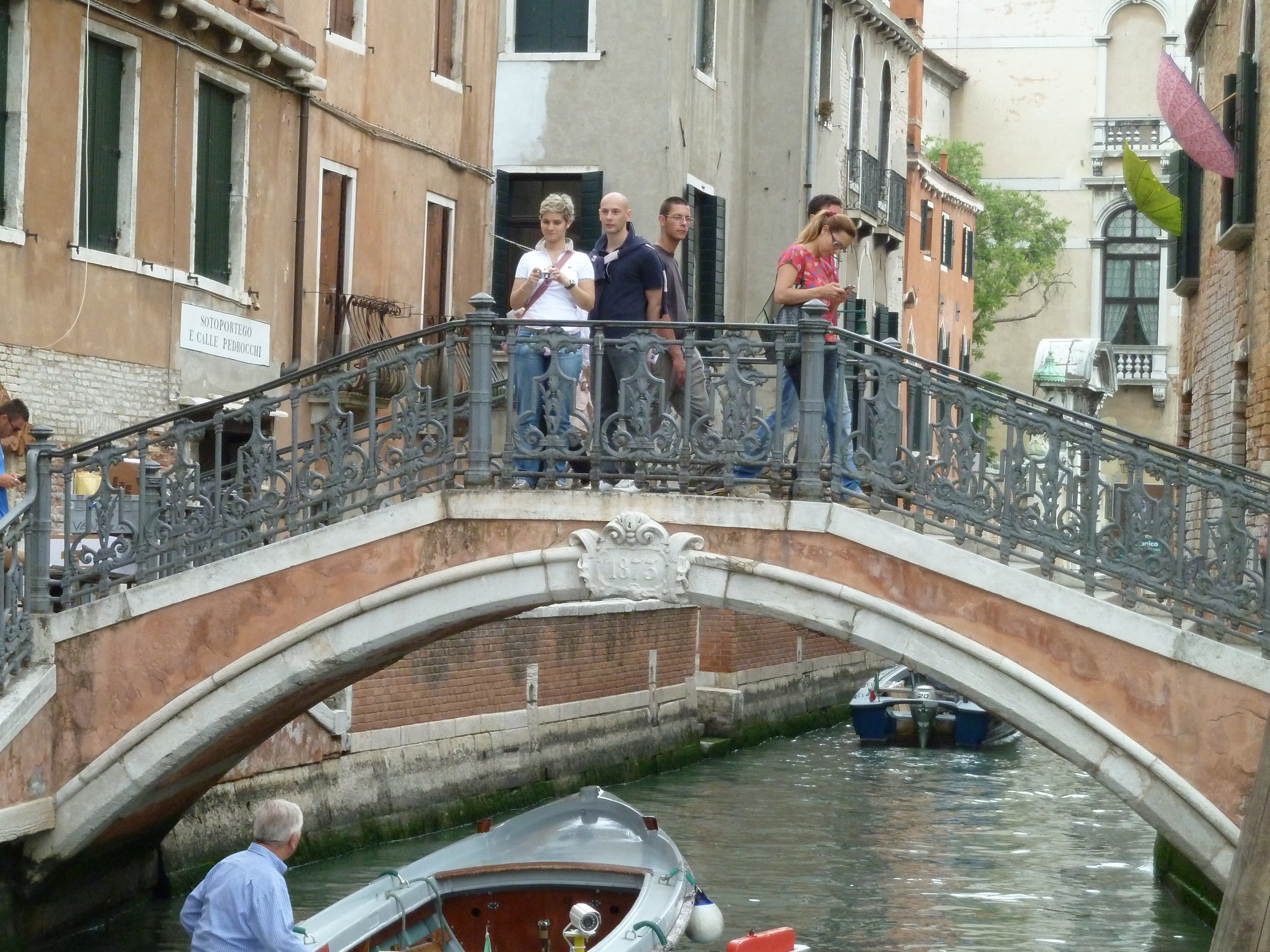
Ponte de San Barnaba
Rio de San Barnaba

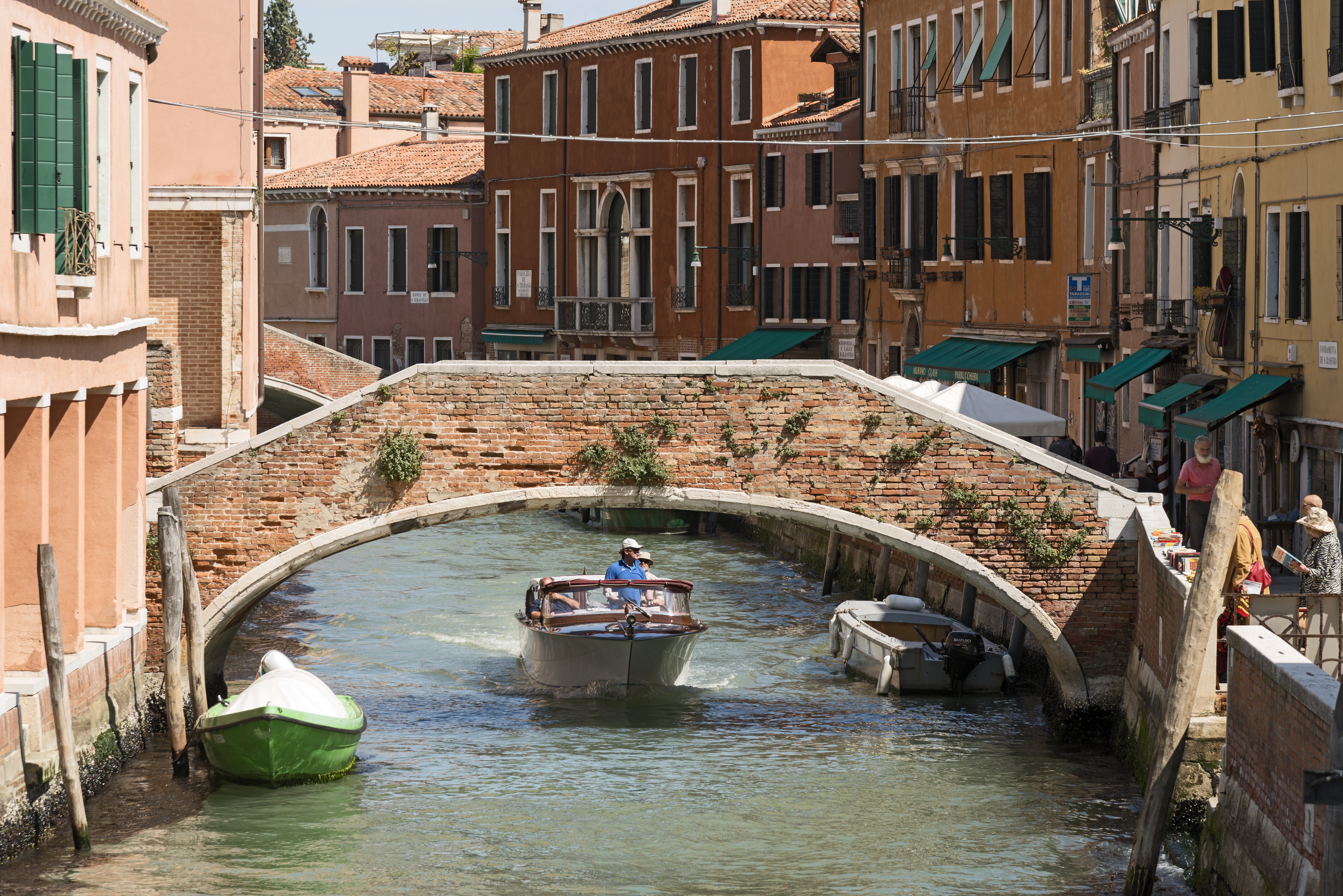
Ponte San Basegio
Rio de San Basegio

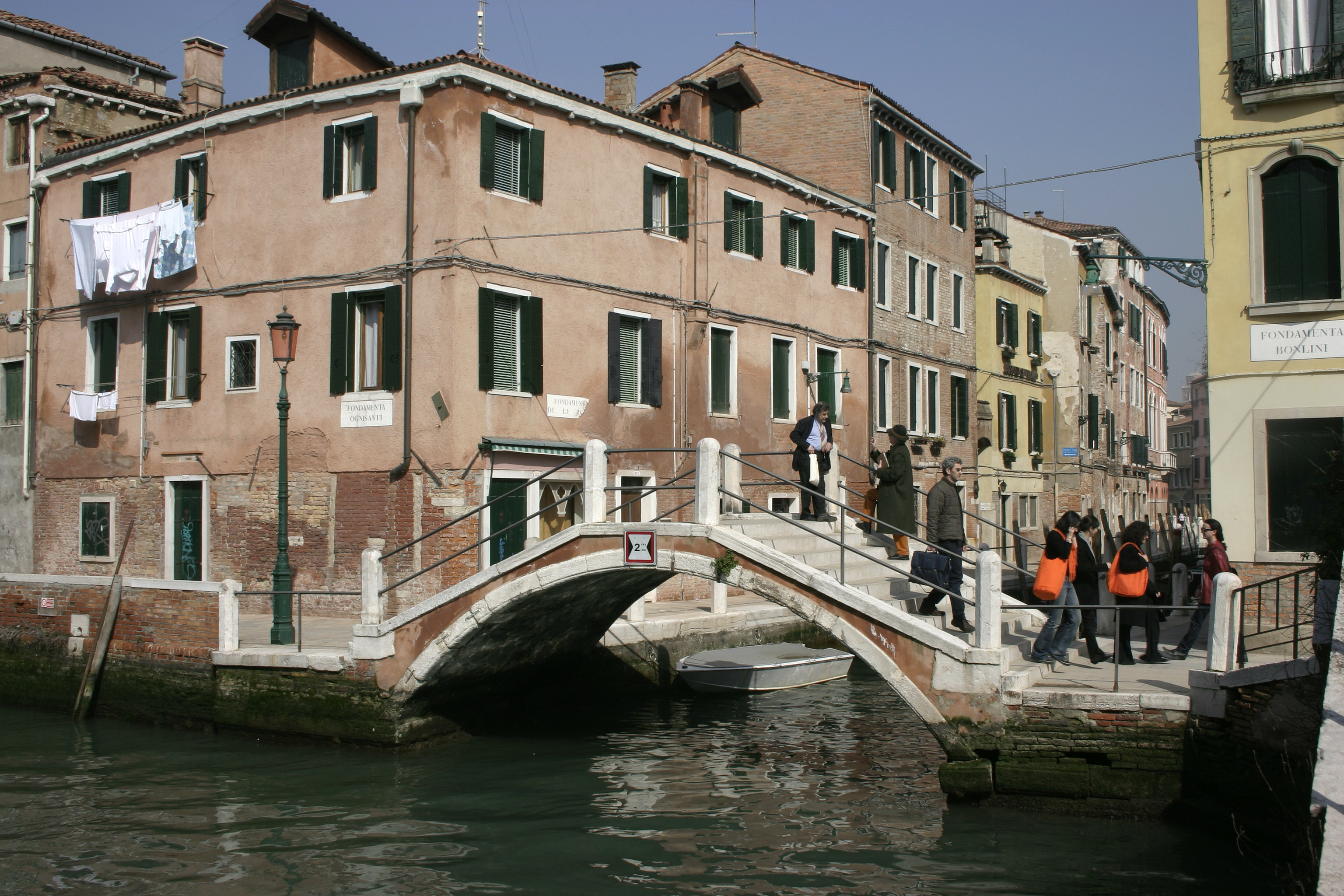
Ponte de Borgo
Rio de le Romite

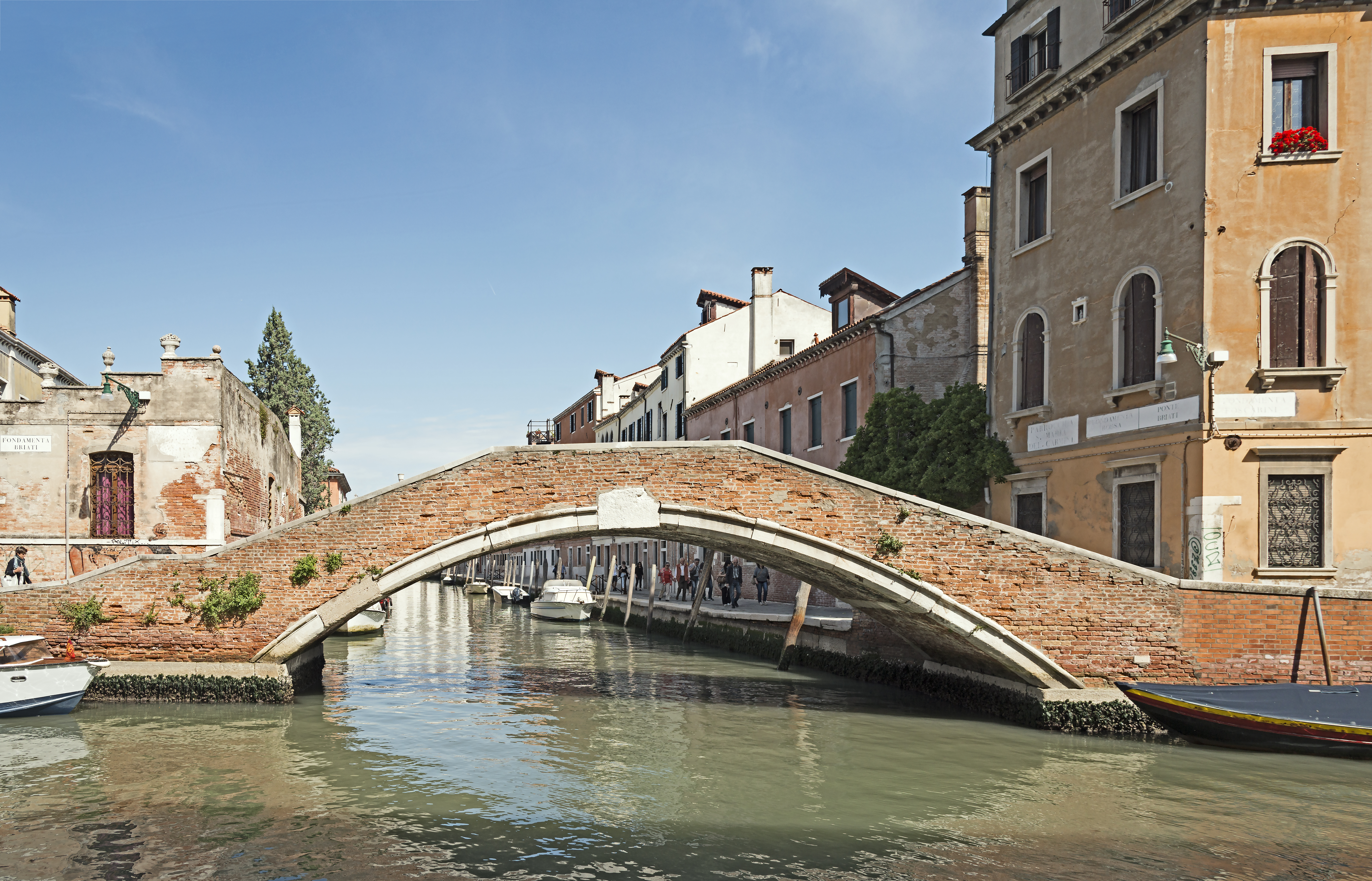
Ponte Briati (anc. dei Martini)
Rio Briati

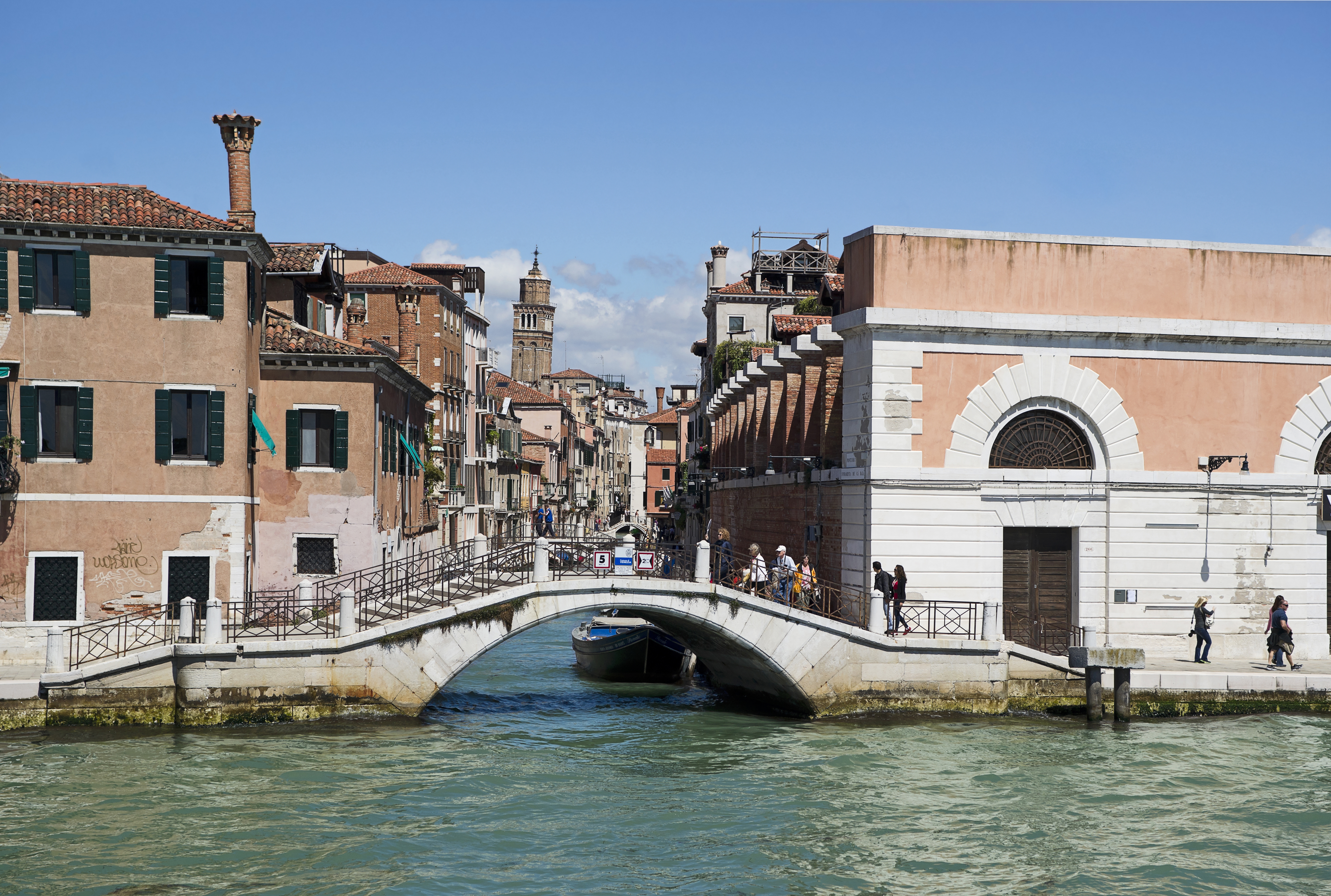
Ponte Ca' Balà
Rio de la Fornaze

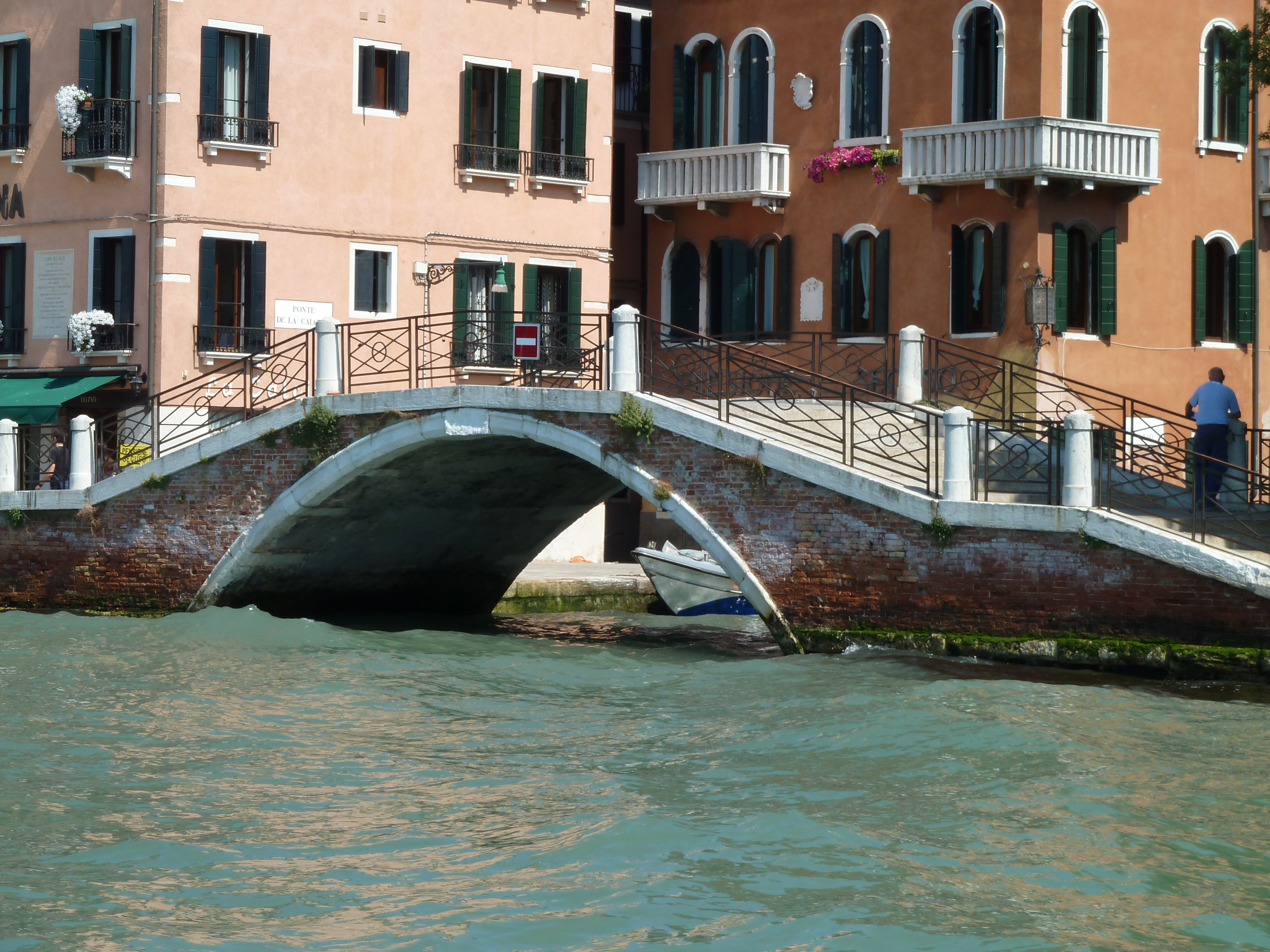
Ponte de la Calcina
Rio de San Vio

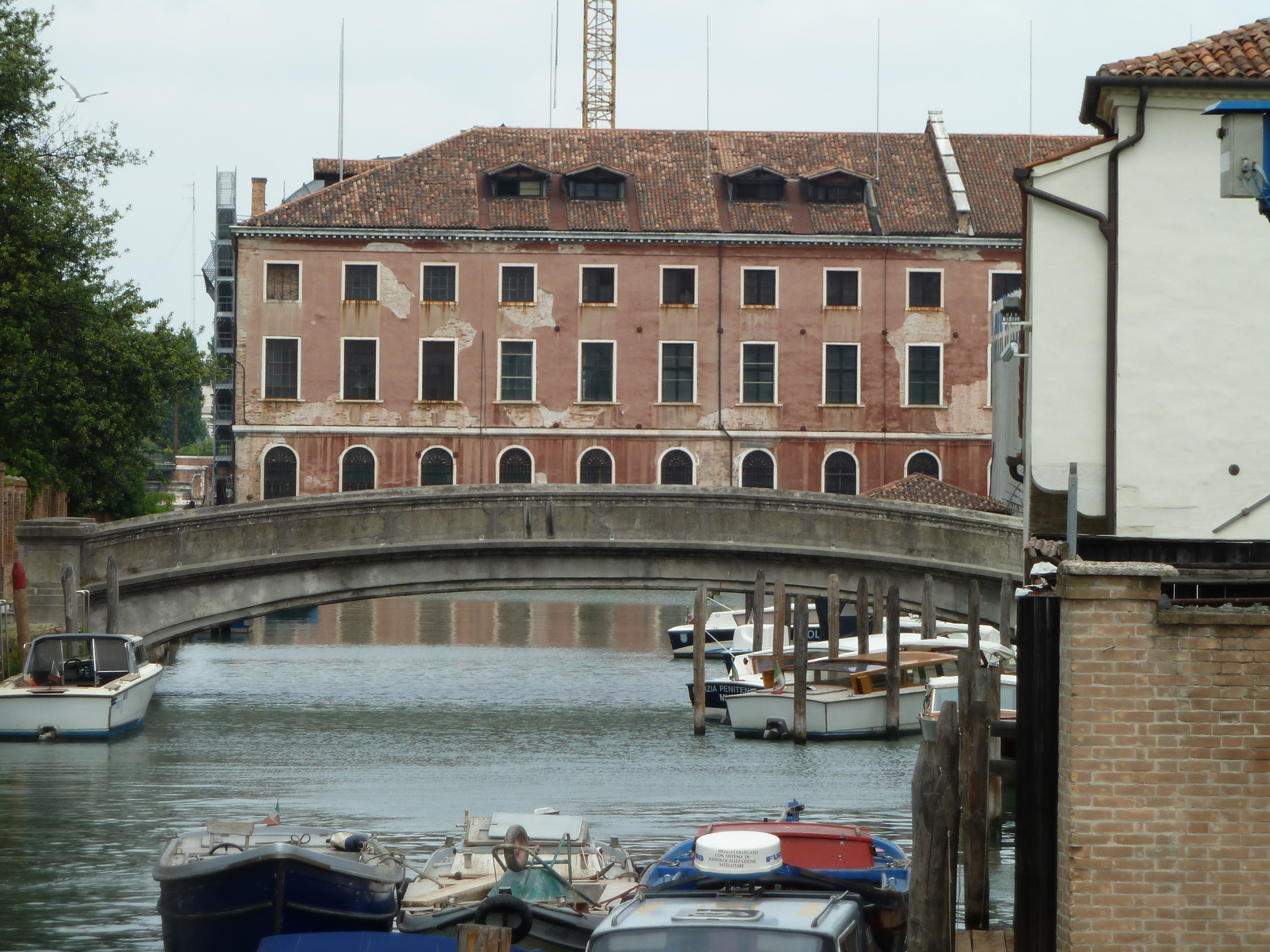
Ponte del Campo di Marte
Rio de Santa Marta

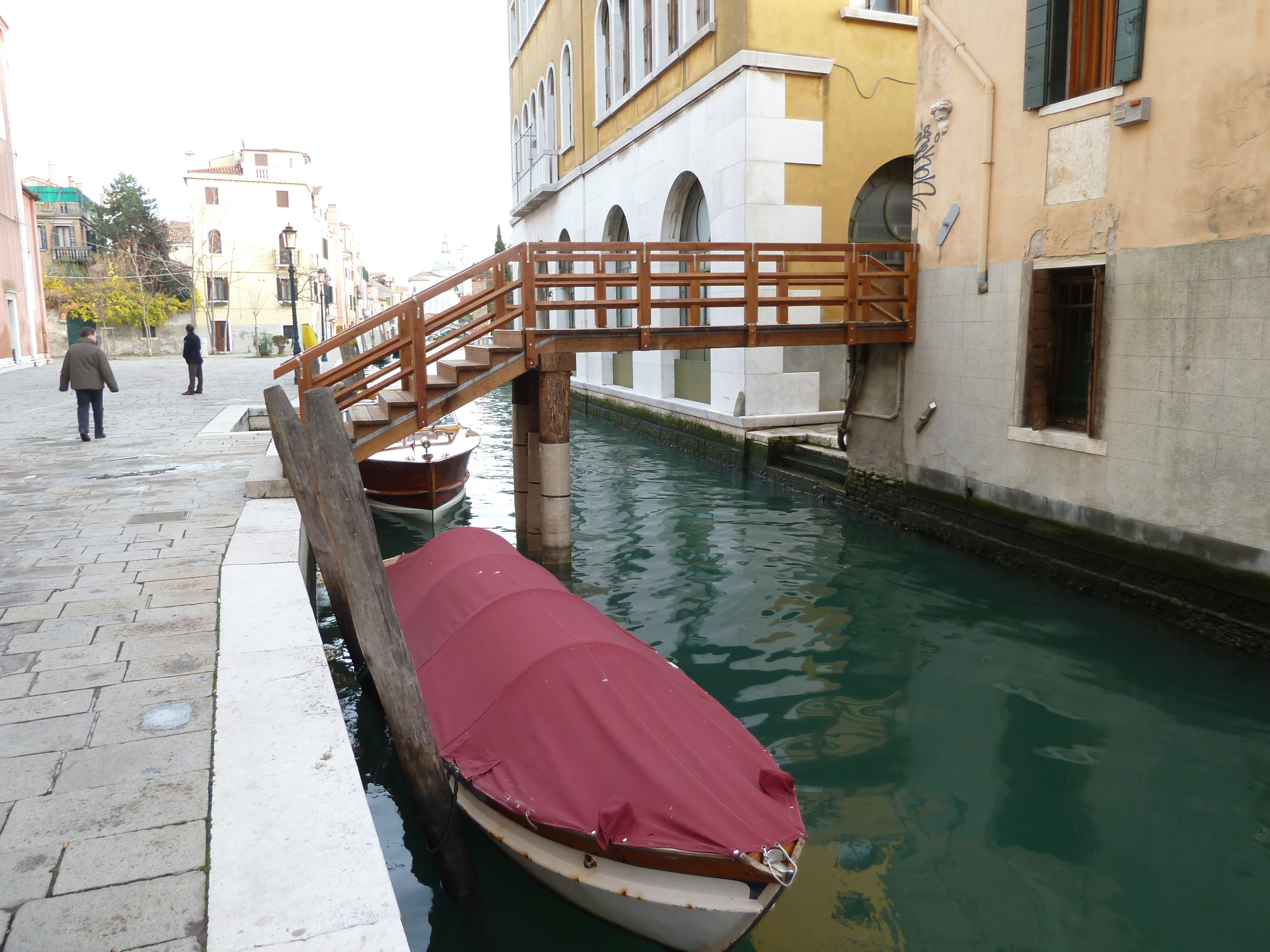
Ponte Canal
Rio dei Ognissanti

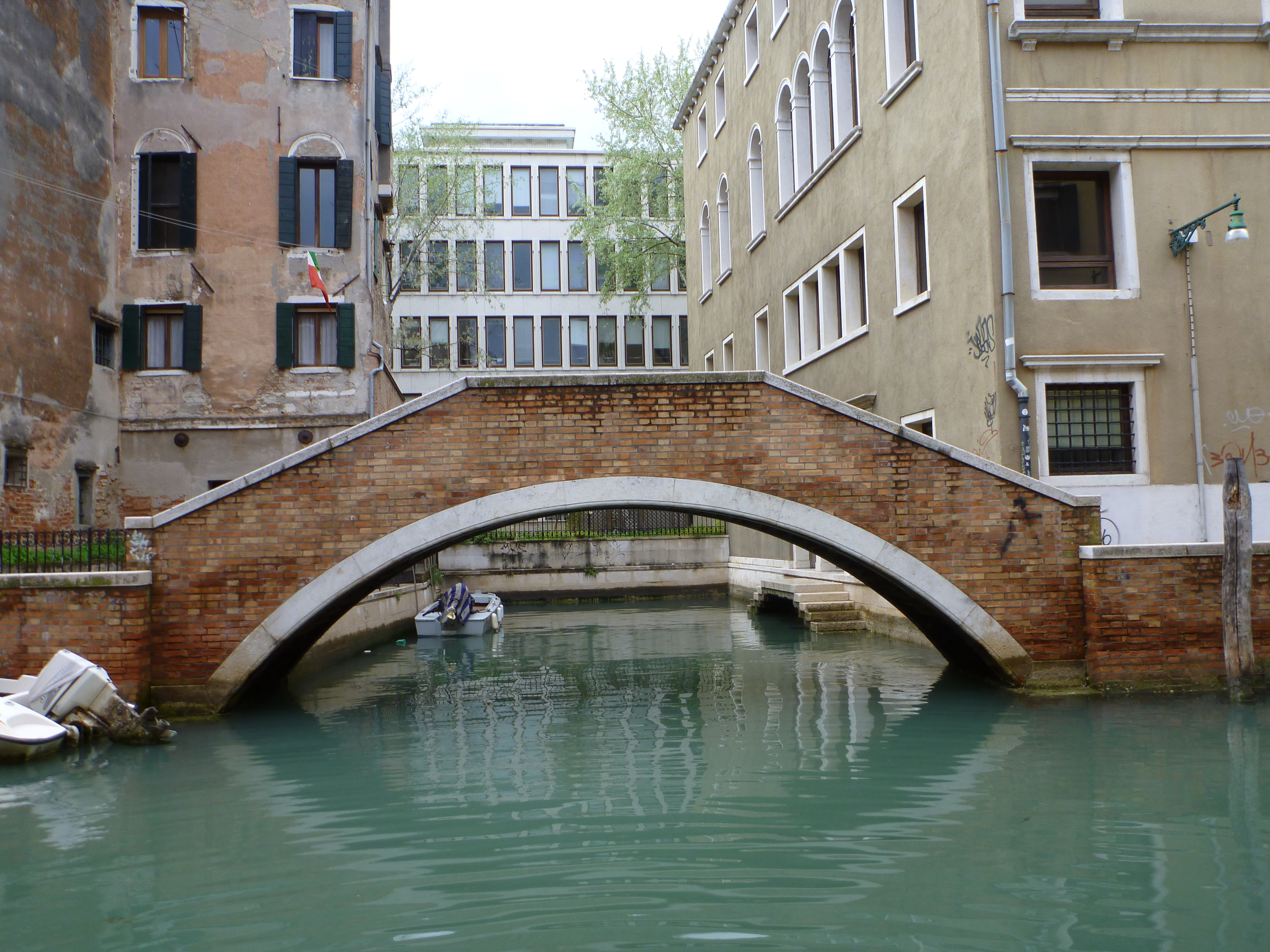
Ponte de la Cavana de l'Enel
Rio dei Carmini - Rio de San Margarita

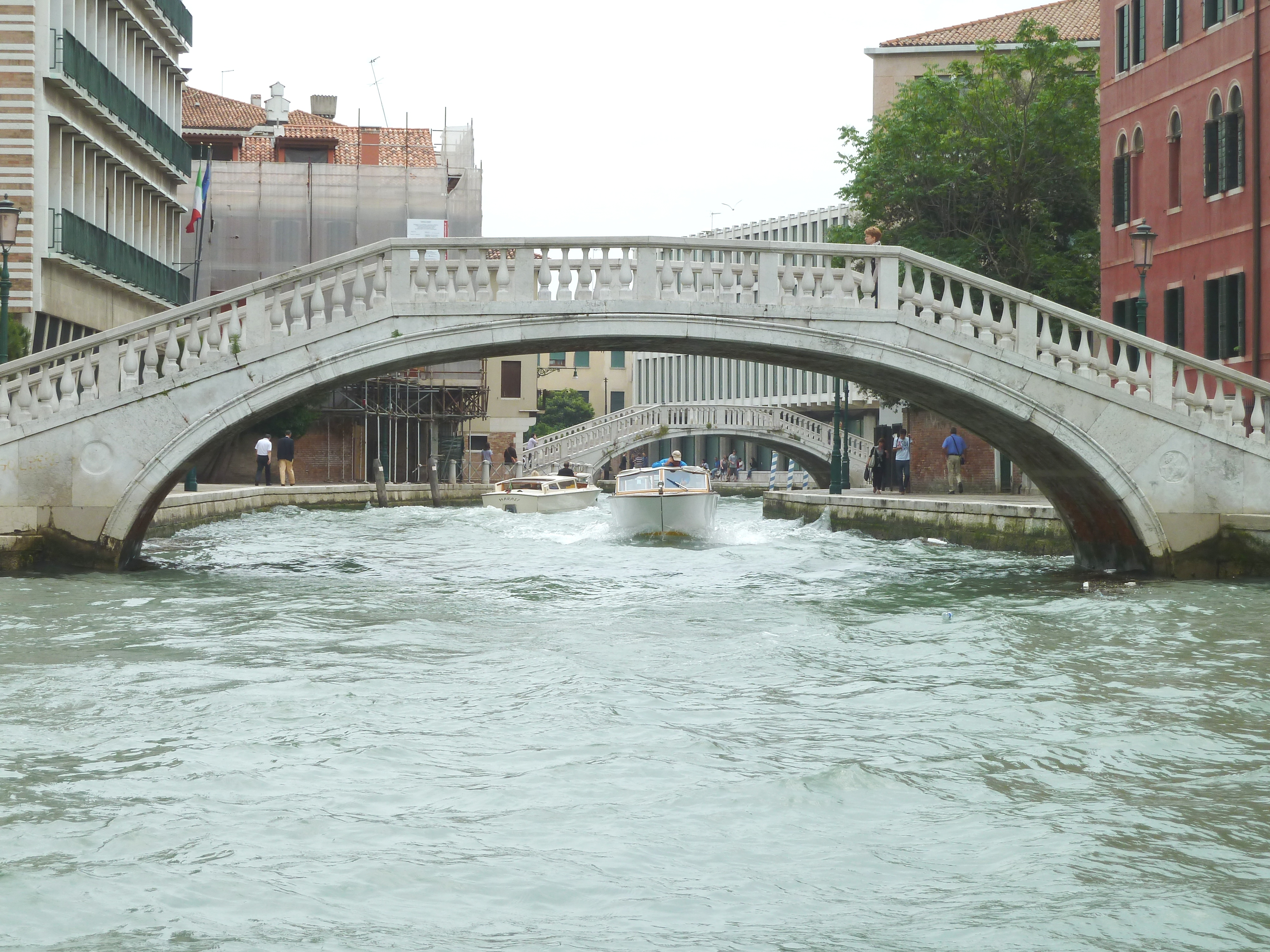
Ponte de la Ceraria
Rio Novo (Venise)

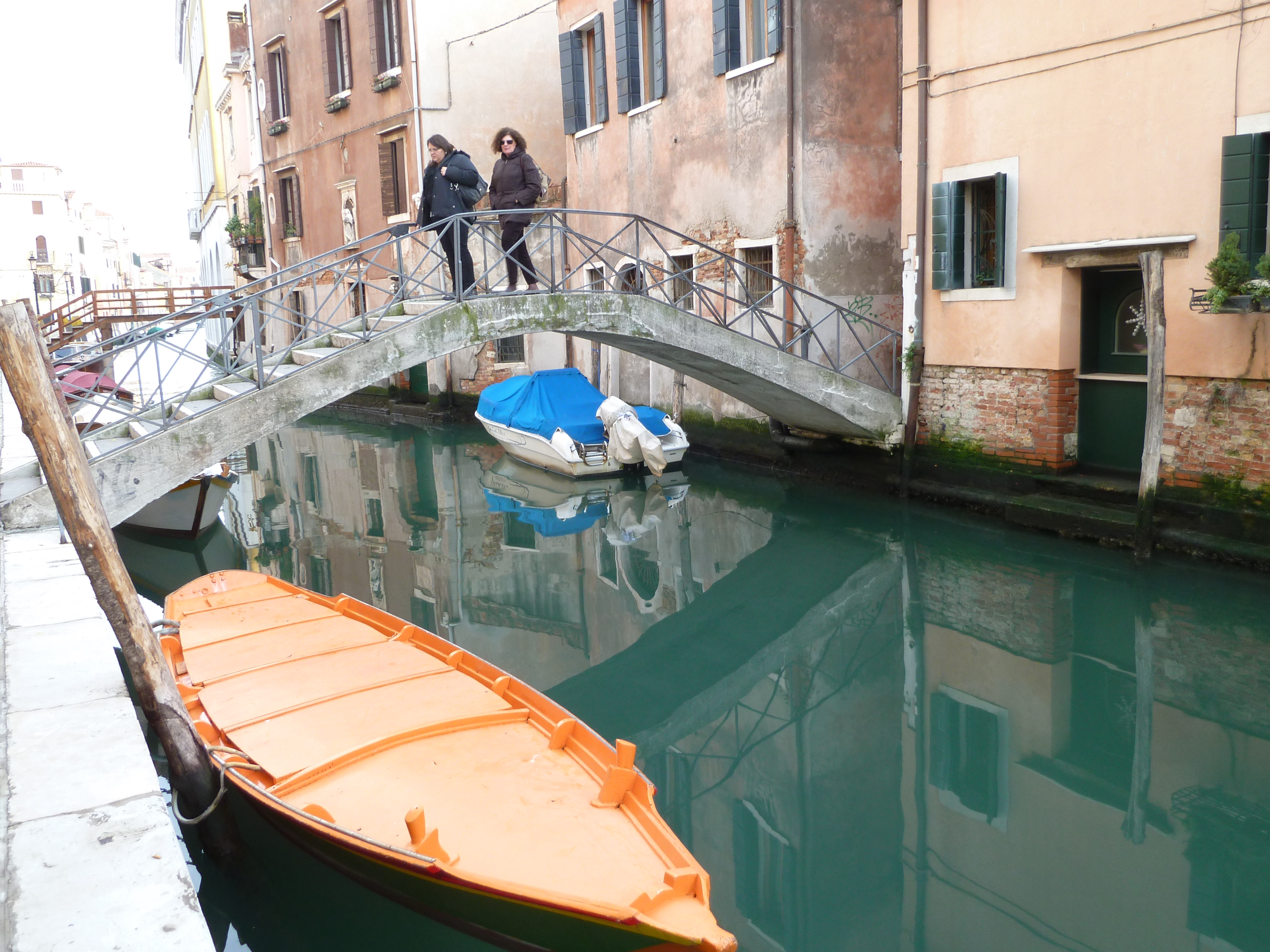
Ponte Corteloto
Rio dei Ognissanti

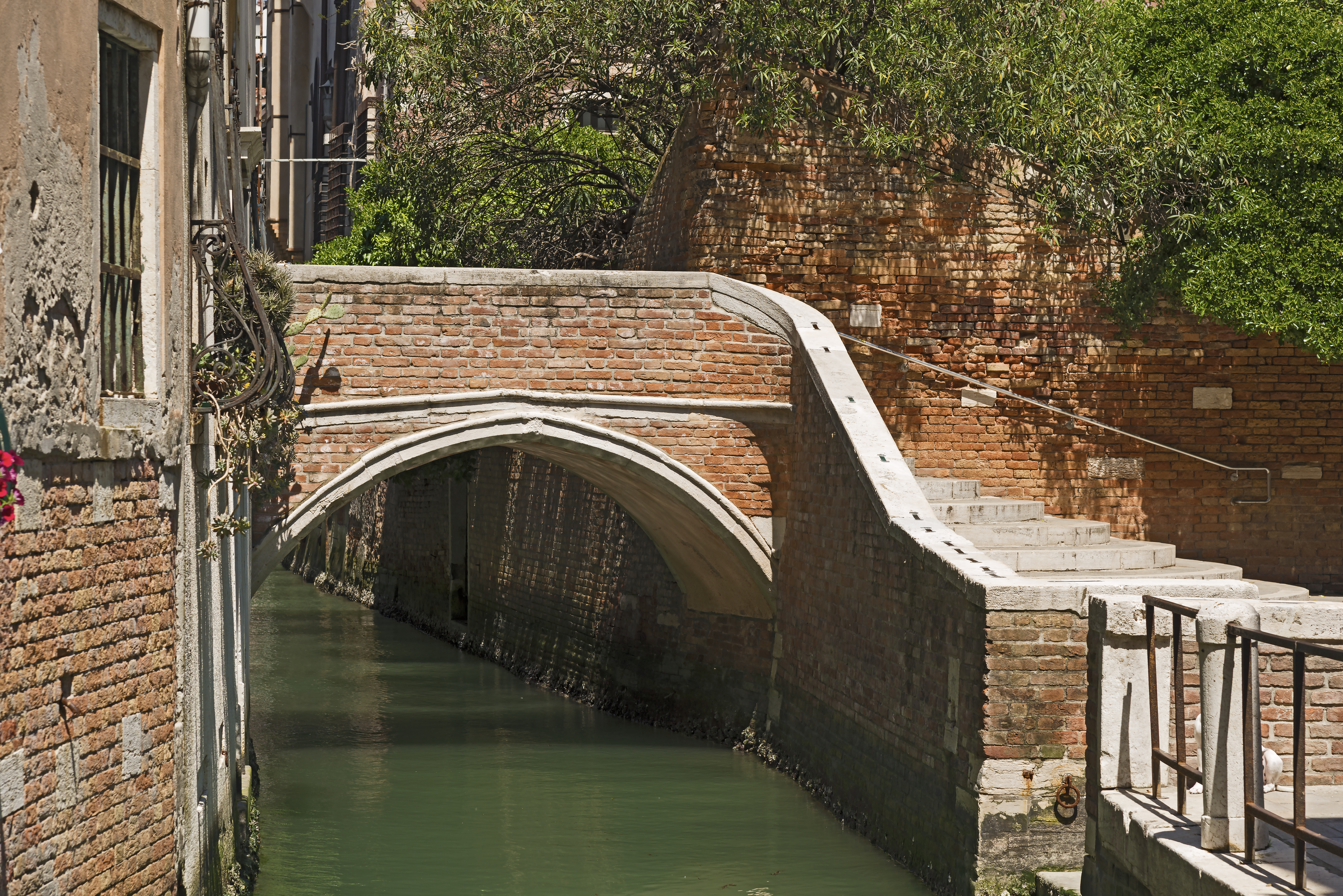
Ponte San Cristoforo
Rio de le Toreselle

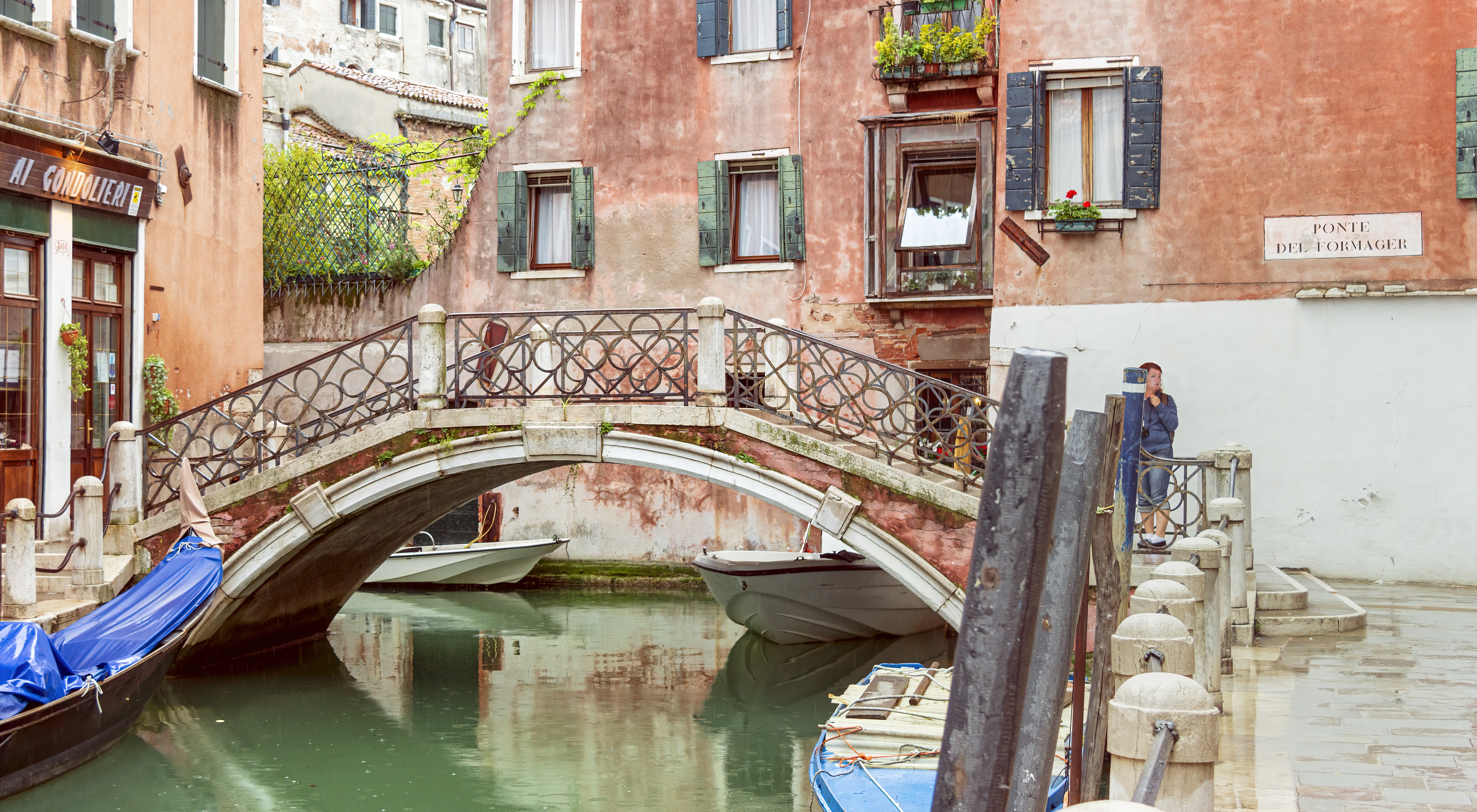
Ponte del Formager
Rio de le Toreselle

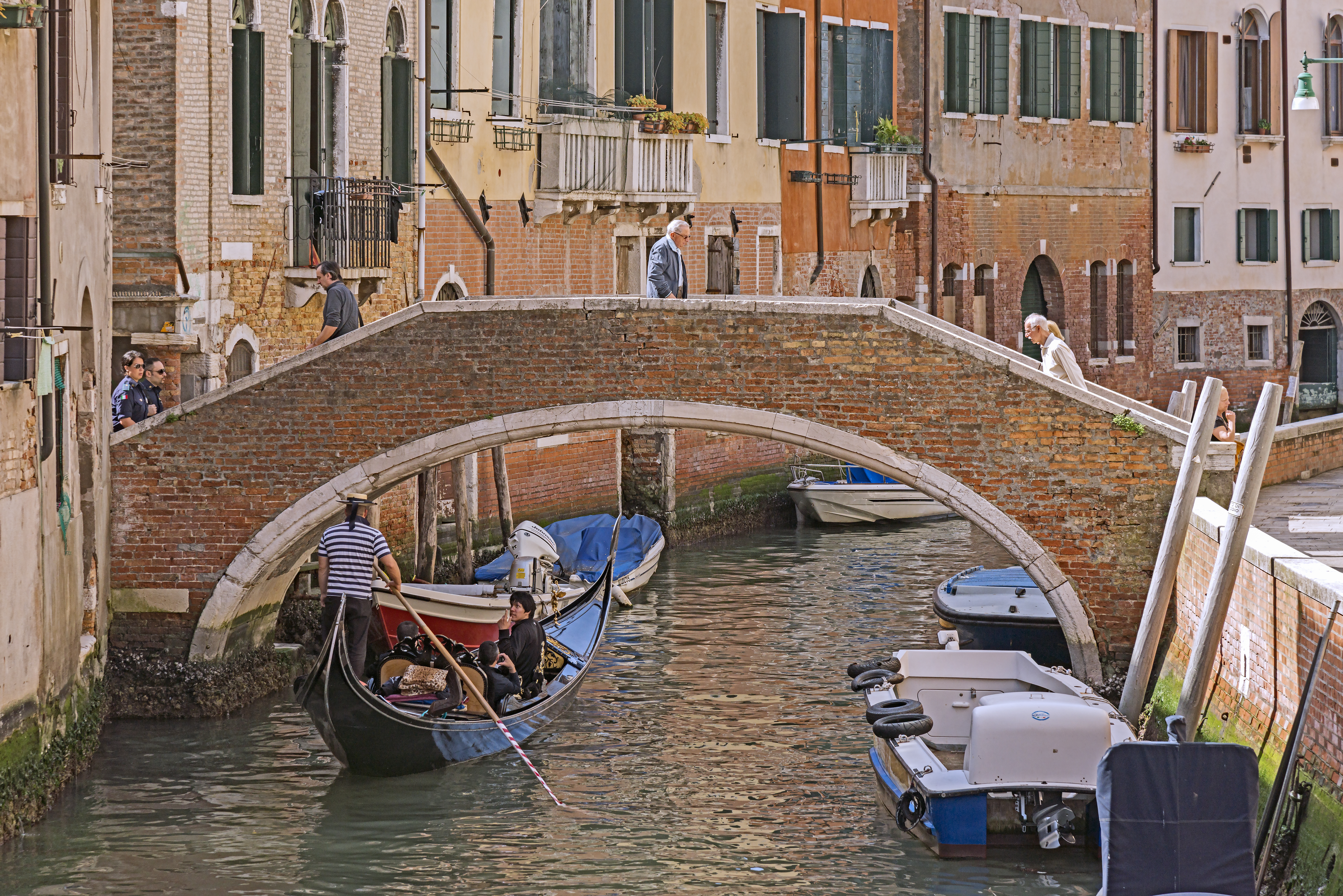
Ponte del Forno
Rio de Santa Margherita

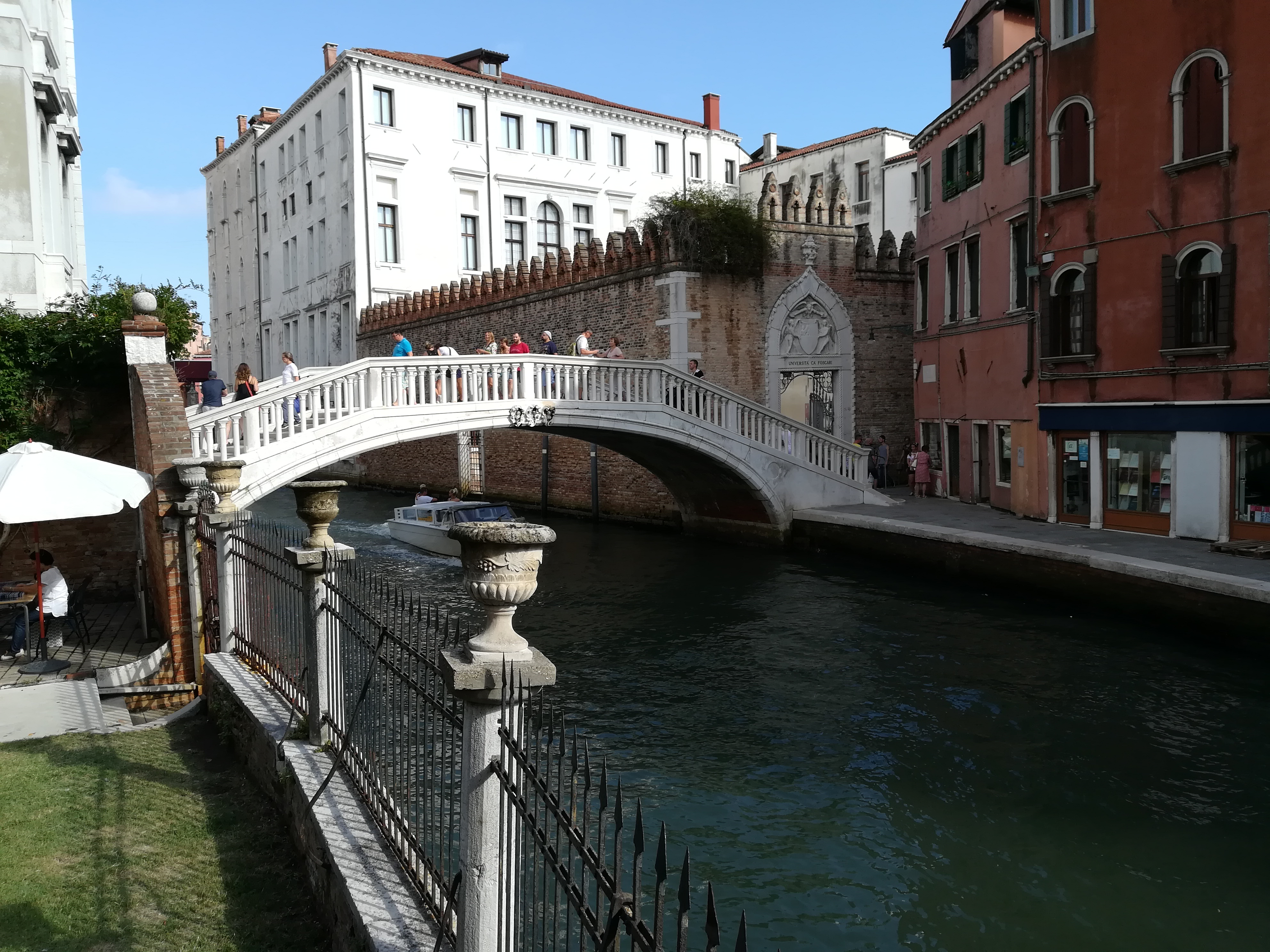
Ponte Foscari
Rio de Ca' Foscari

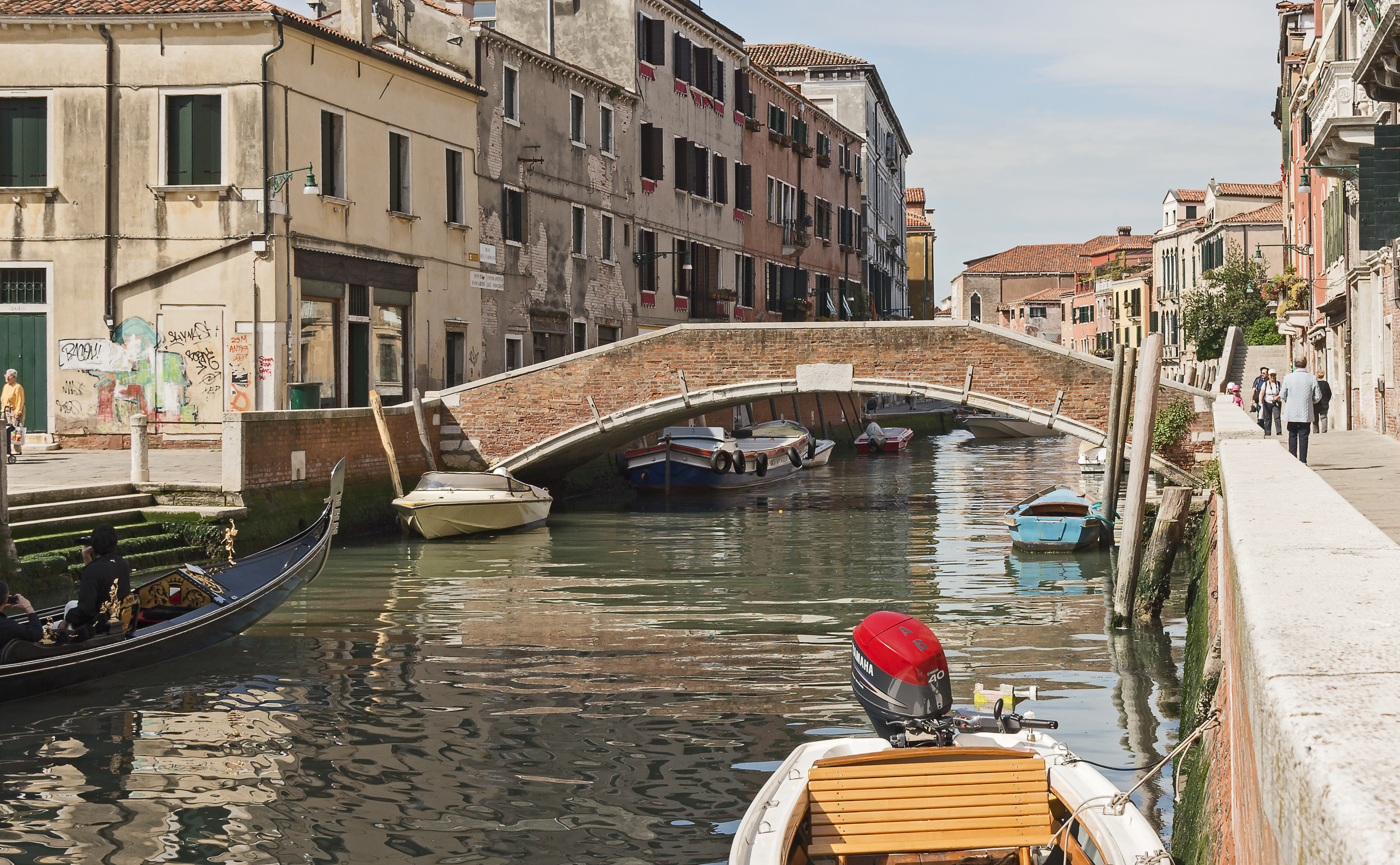
Ponte Foscarini
Rio de Santa Margherita e Rio dei Carmini

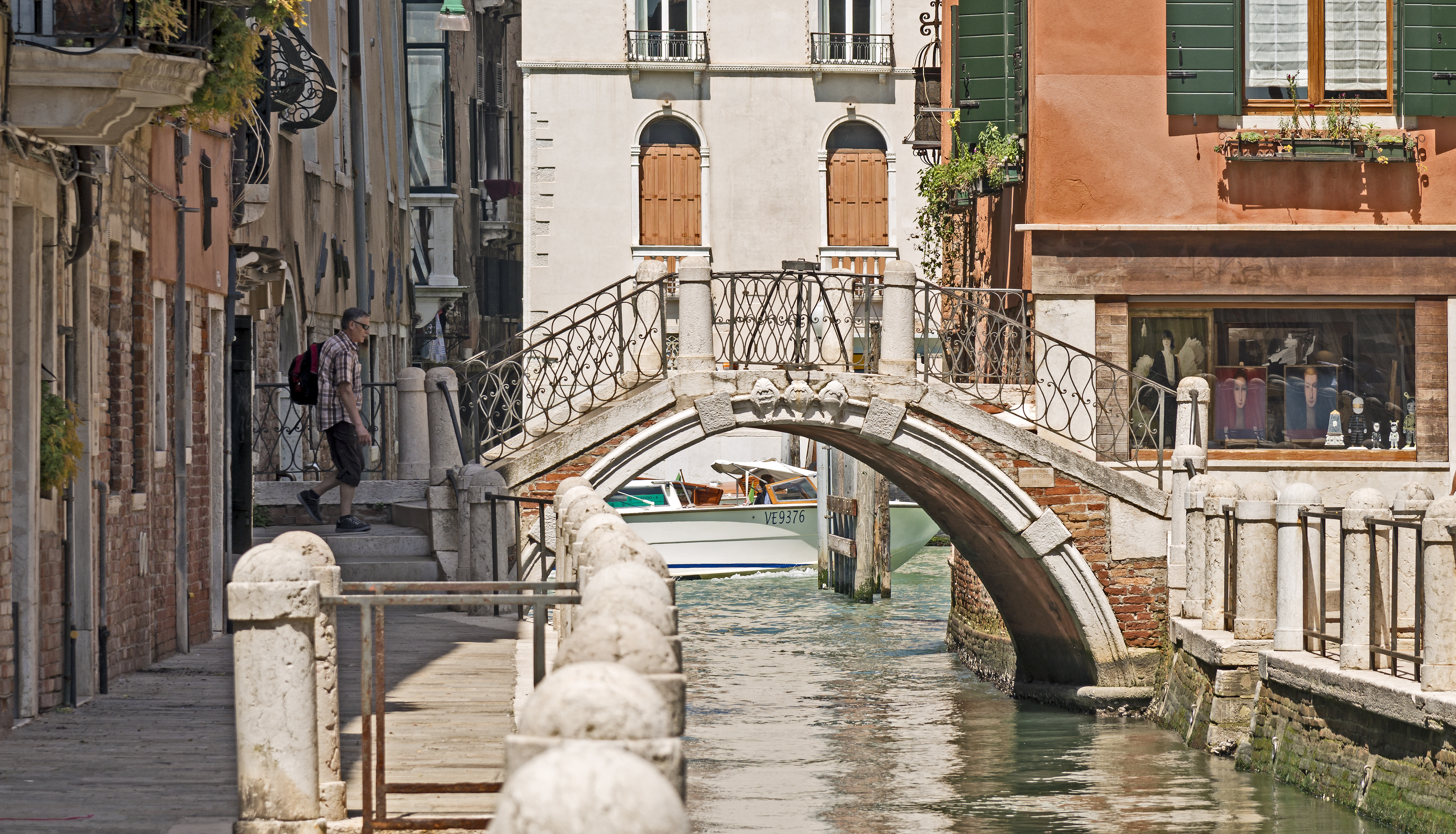
Ponte San Gregorio
Rio de la Fornaze

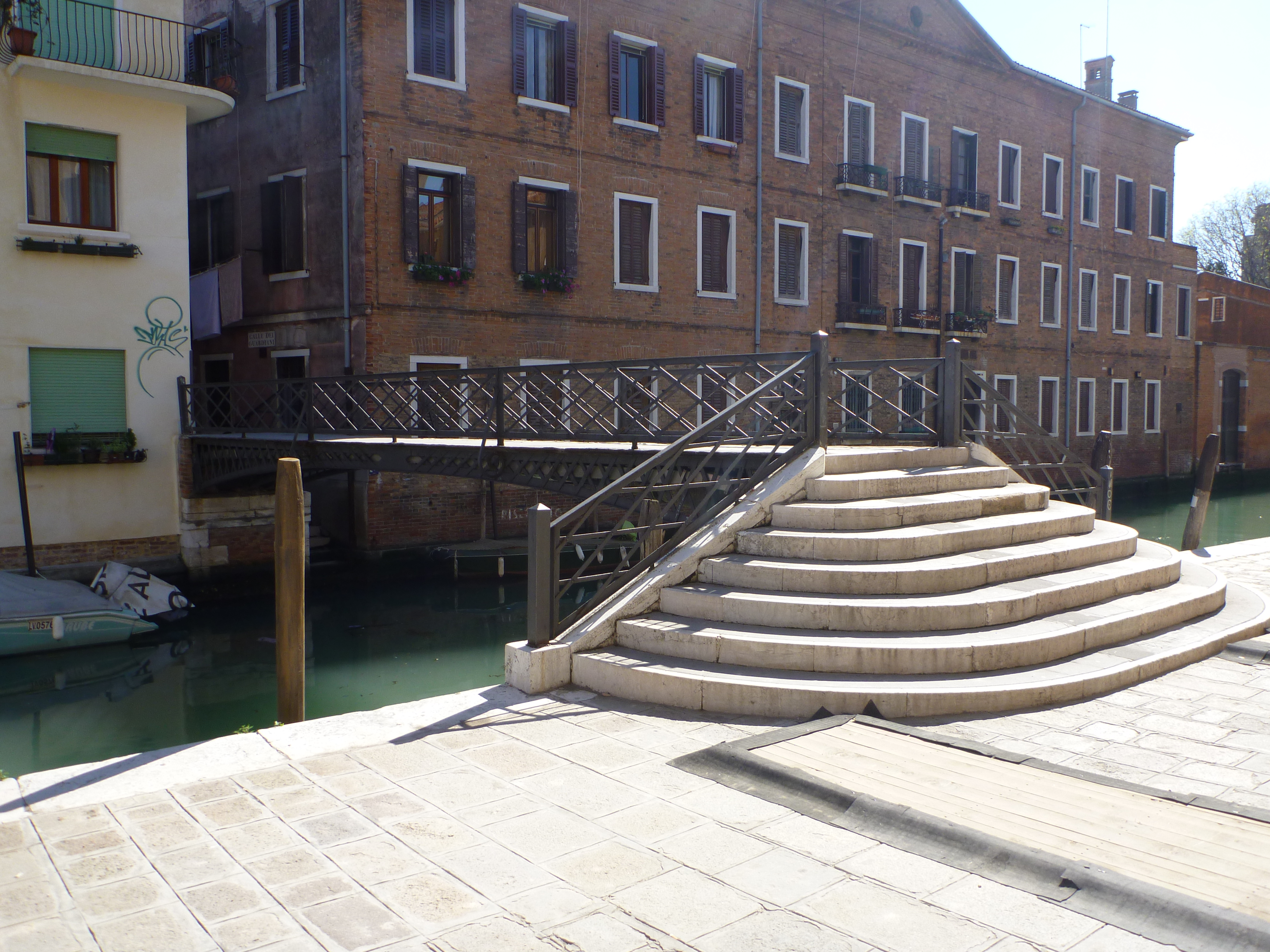
Ponte dei Guardiani
Rio del Tentor

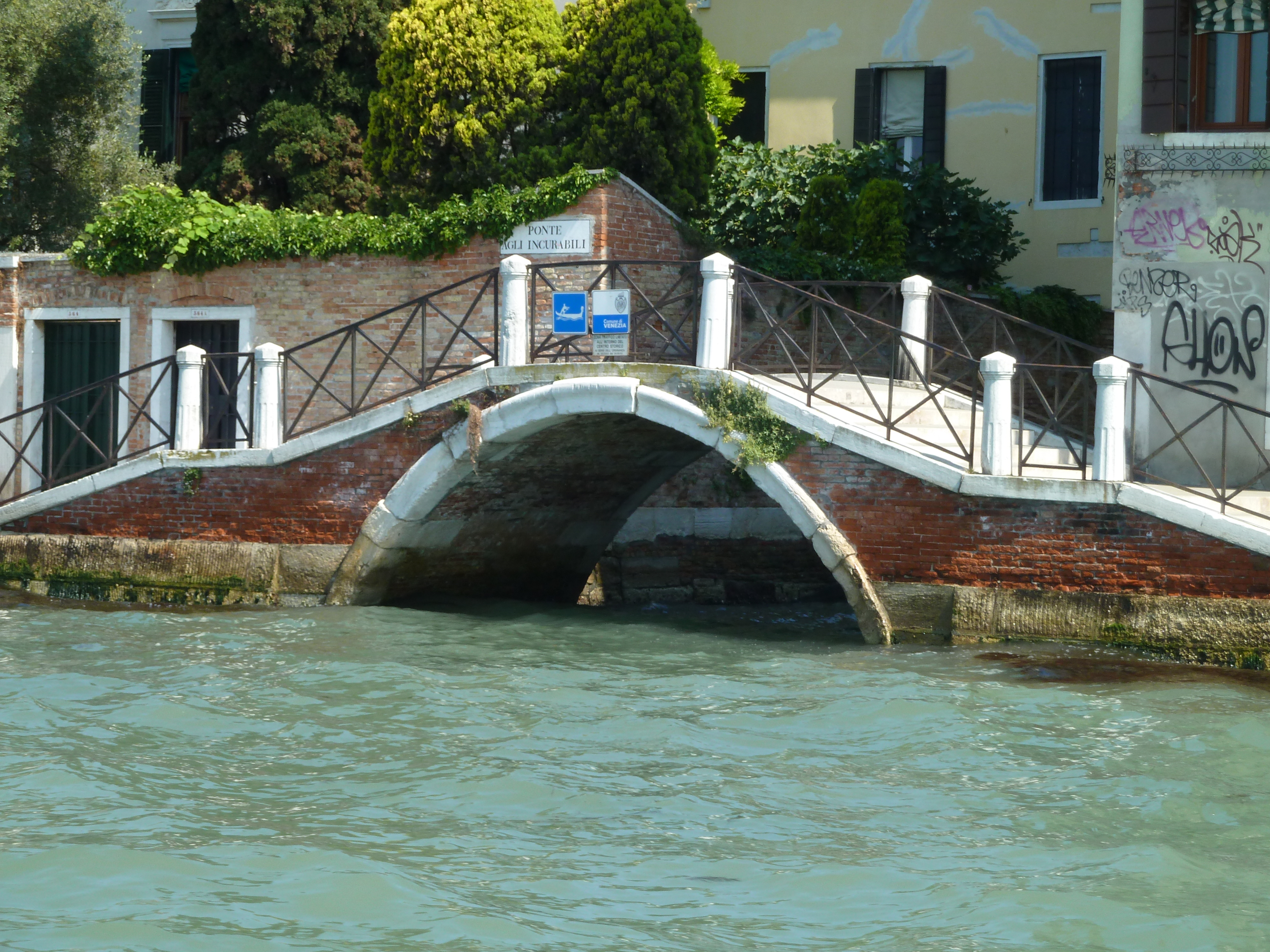
Ponte agli Incurabili
Rio de le Toreselle

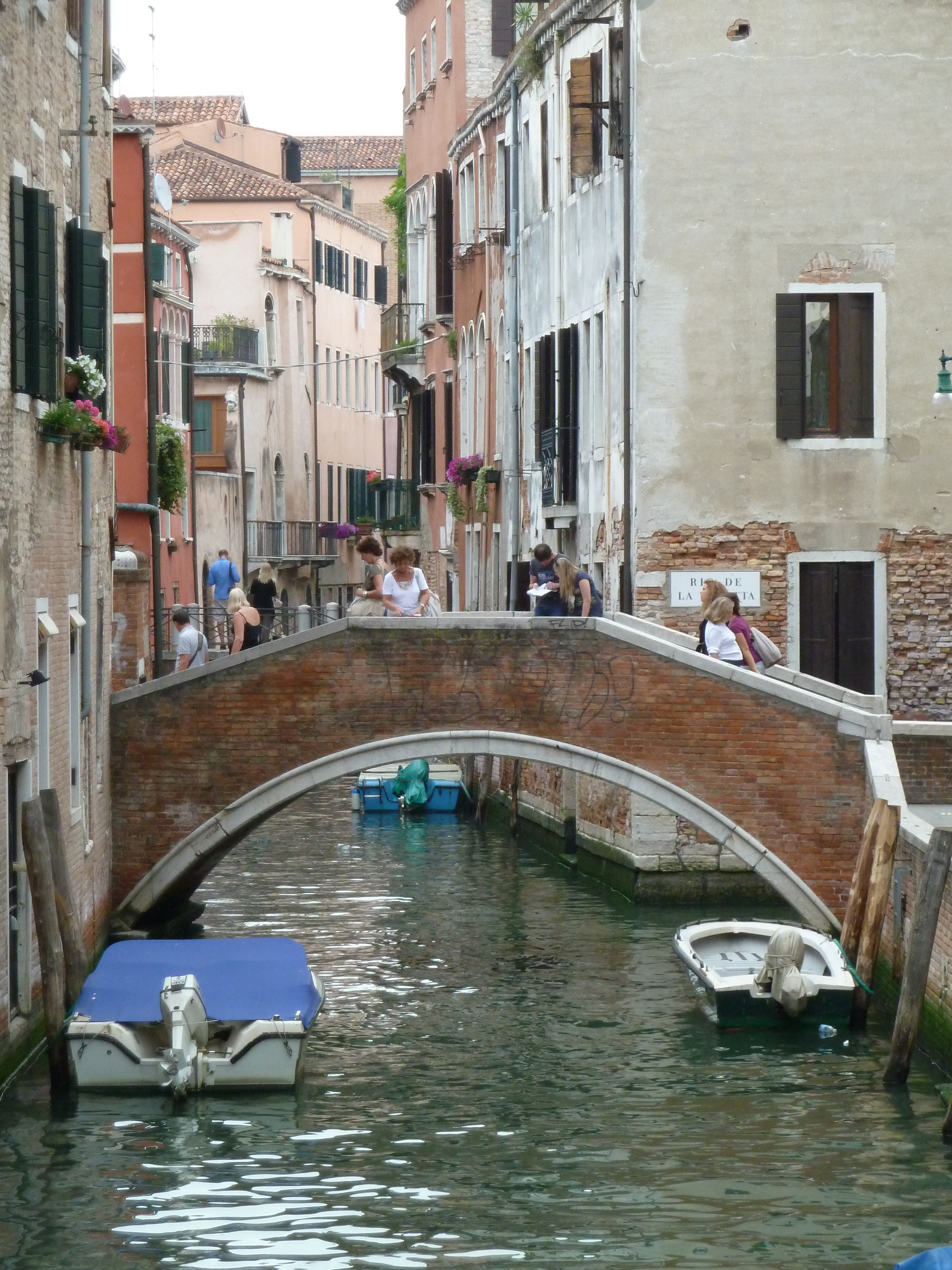
Ponte Lombardo
Rio del Malpaga

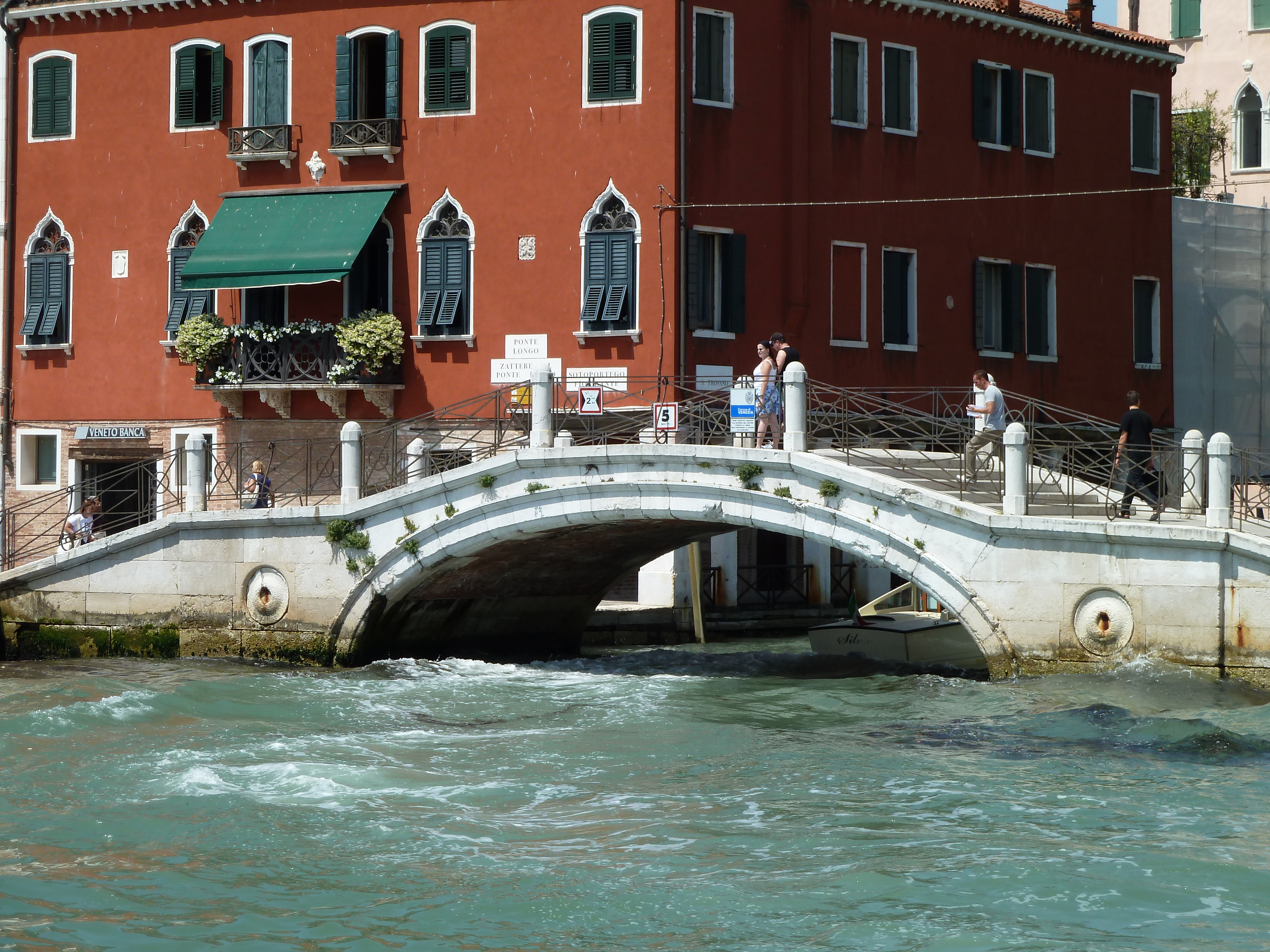
Ponte Longo
Rio de San Trovaso

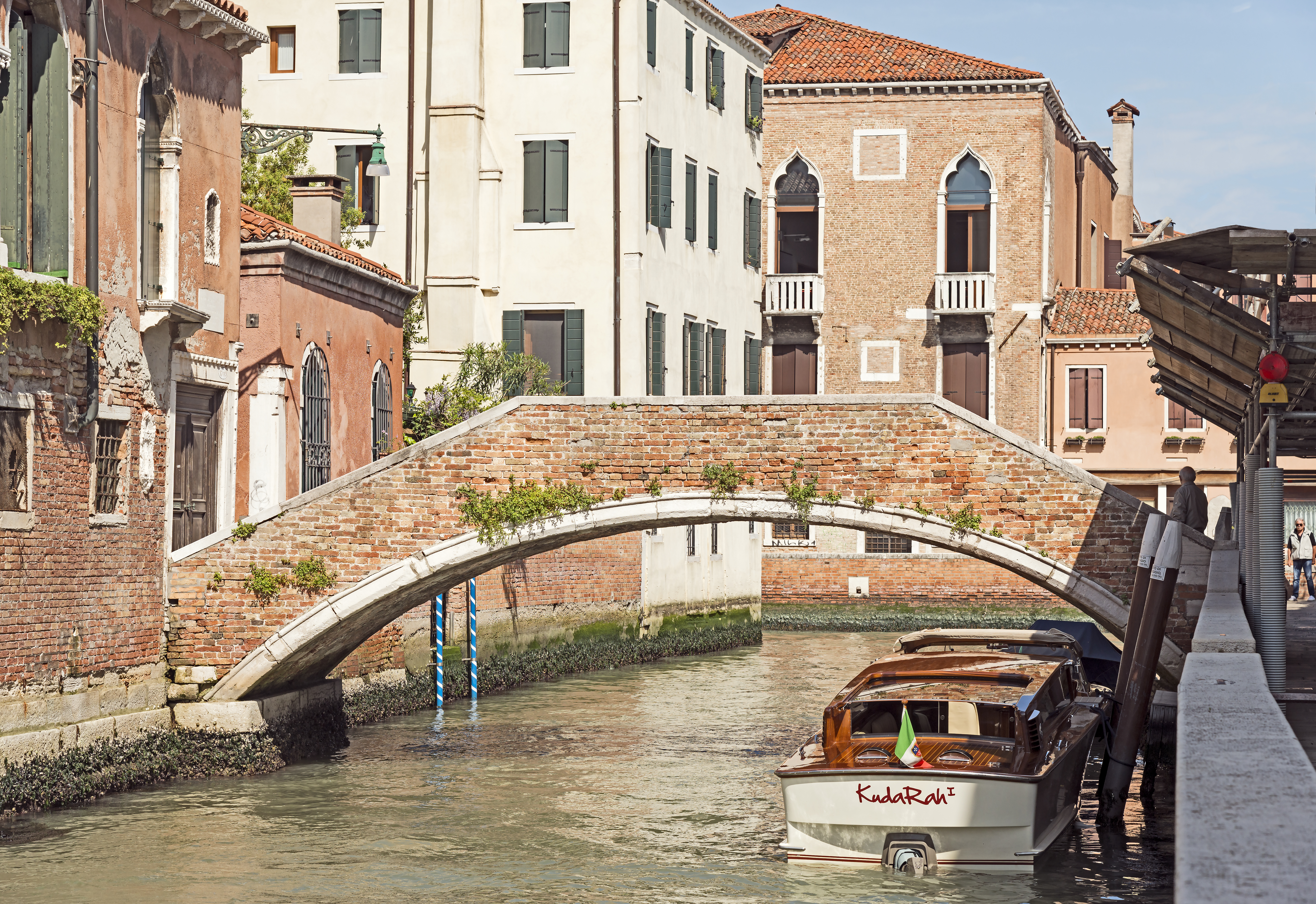
Ponte de la Maddalena
Rio de San Sebastian

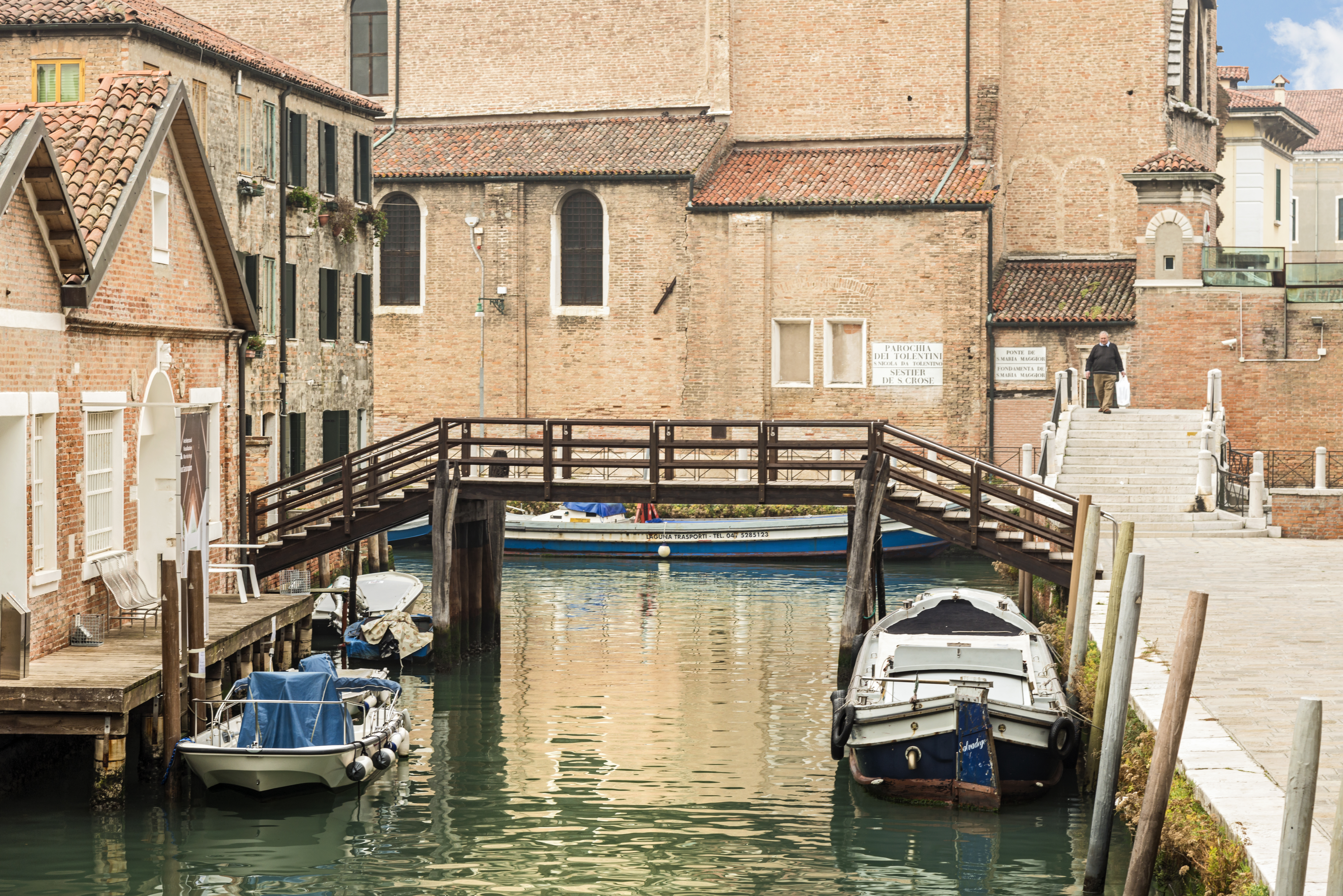
Ponte de la Madona
Rio del Tentor

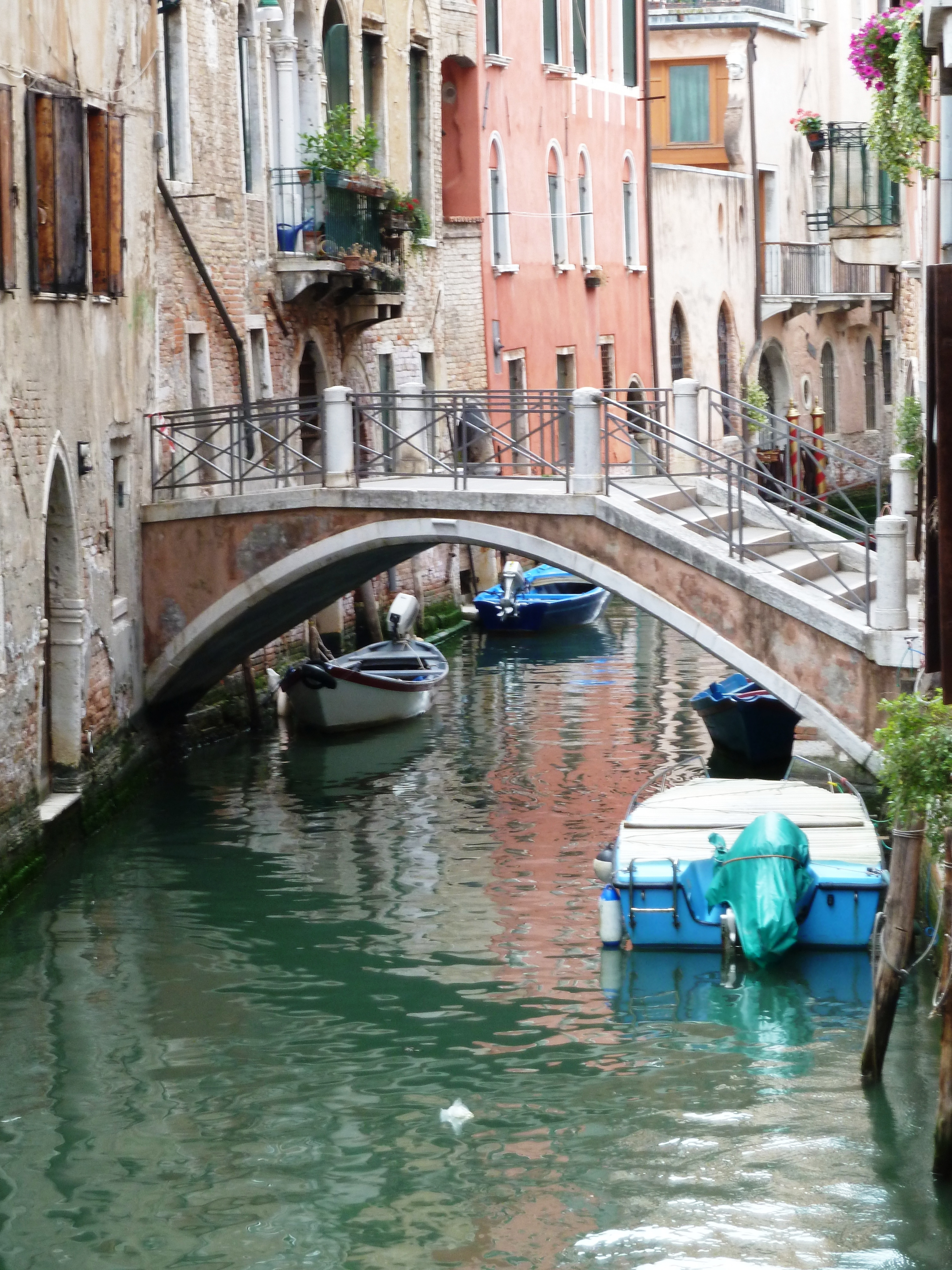
Ponte Malpaga
Rio del Malpaga

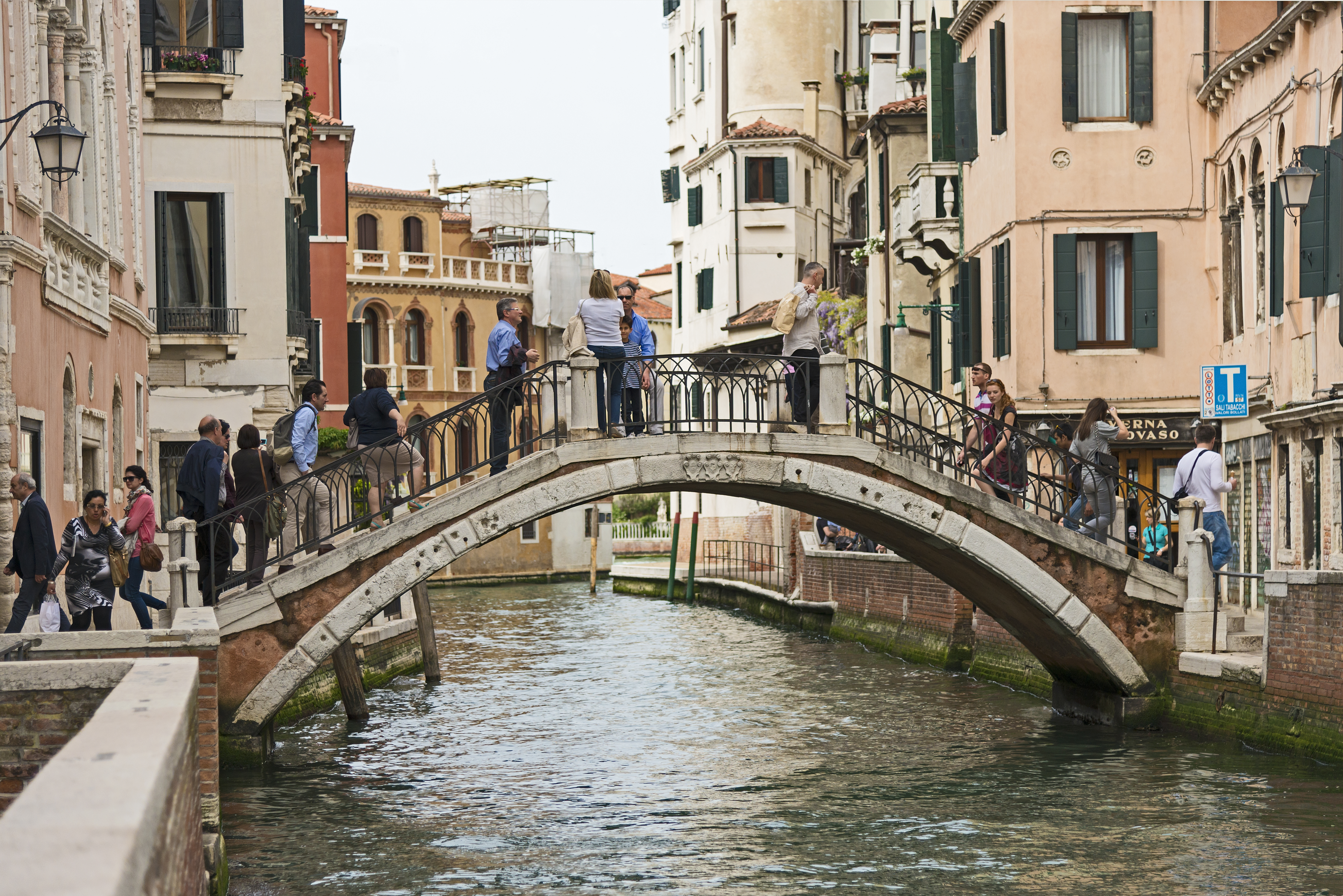
Ponte Maravegia
Rio de San Trovaso

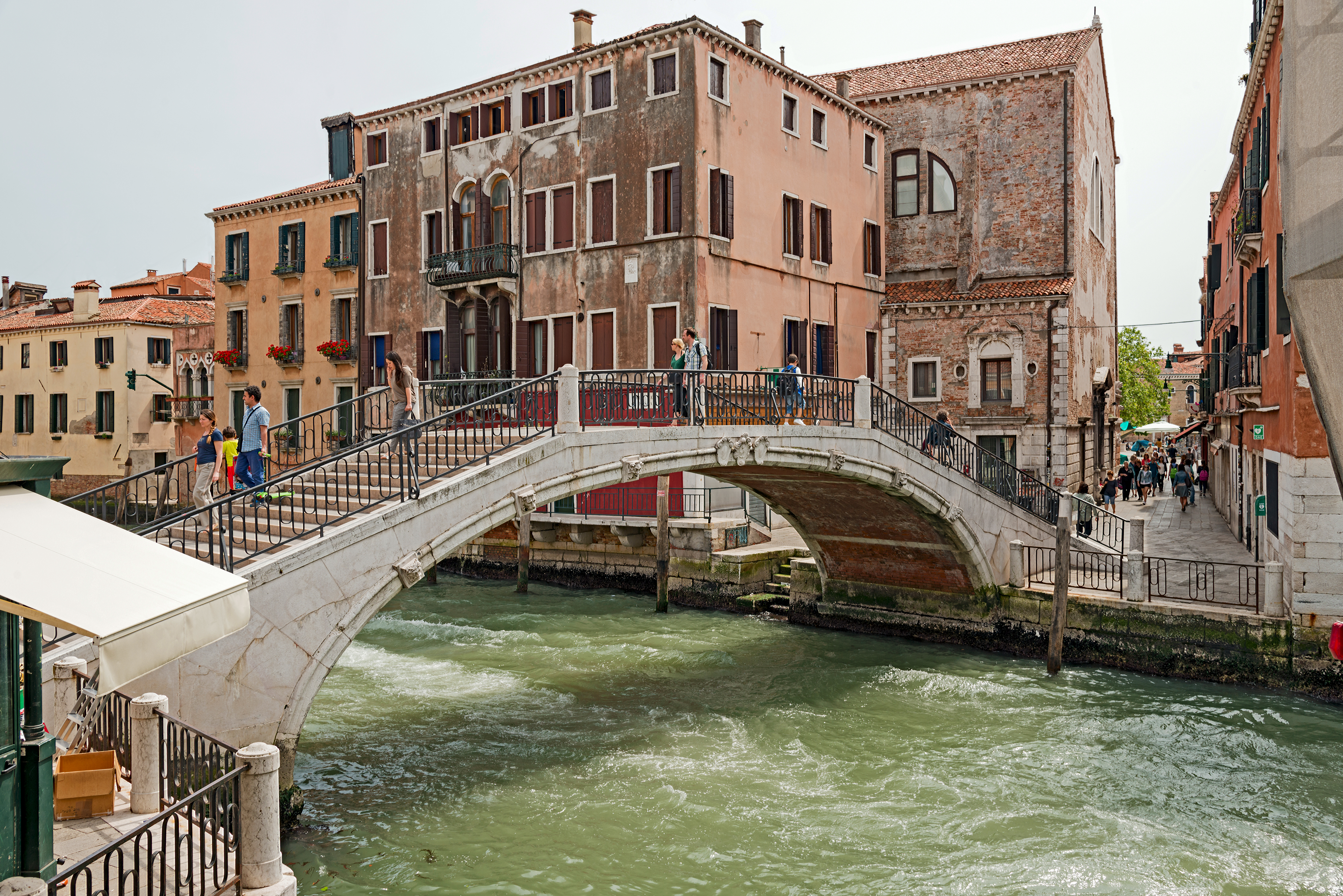
Ponte Santa Margherita
Rio de Ca' Foscari

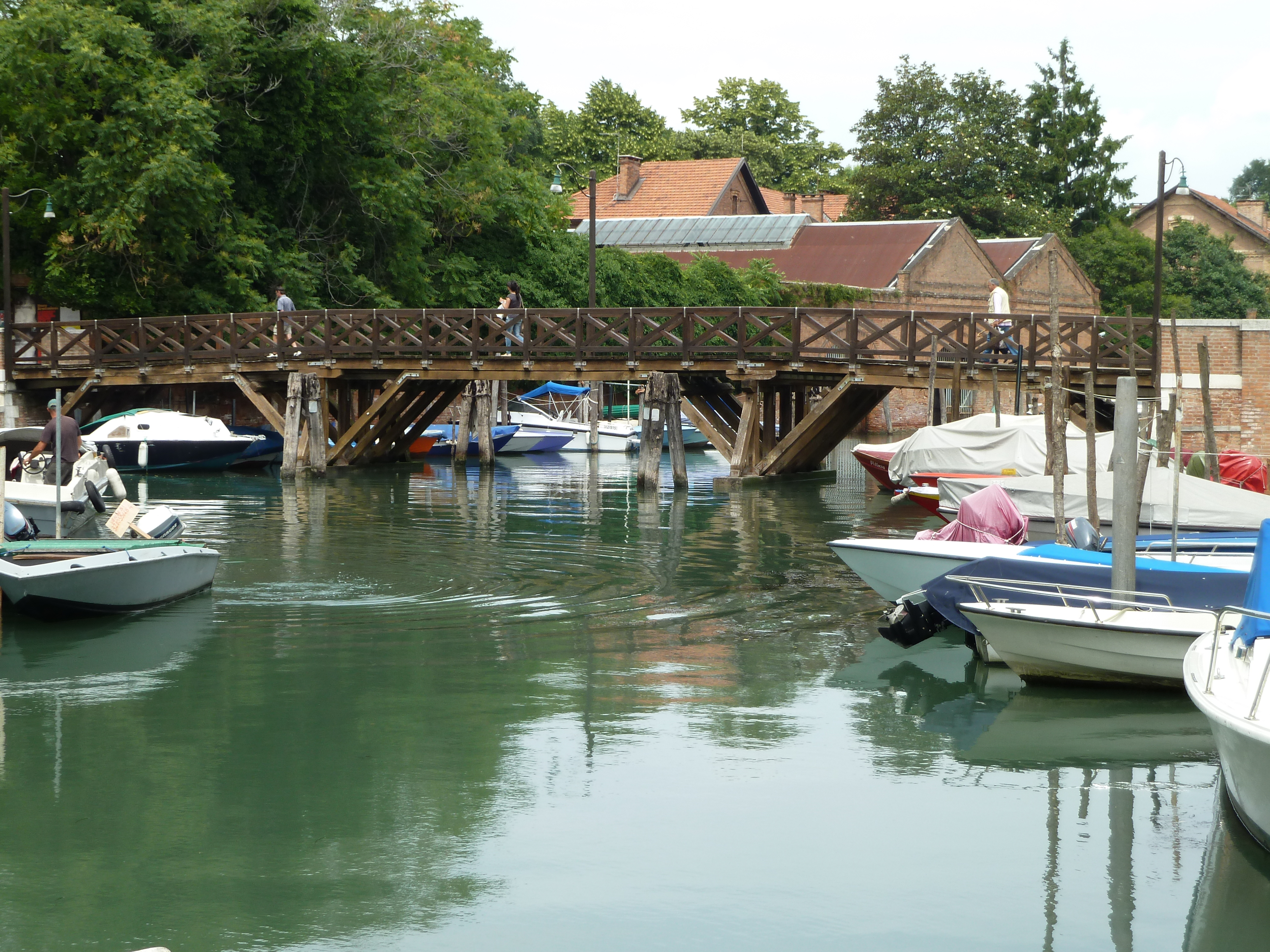
Ponte (Novo) Santa Marta
Rio de l'Arzere

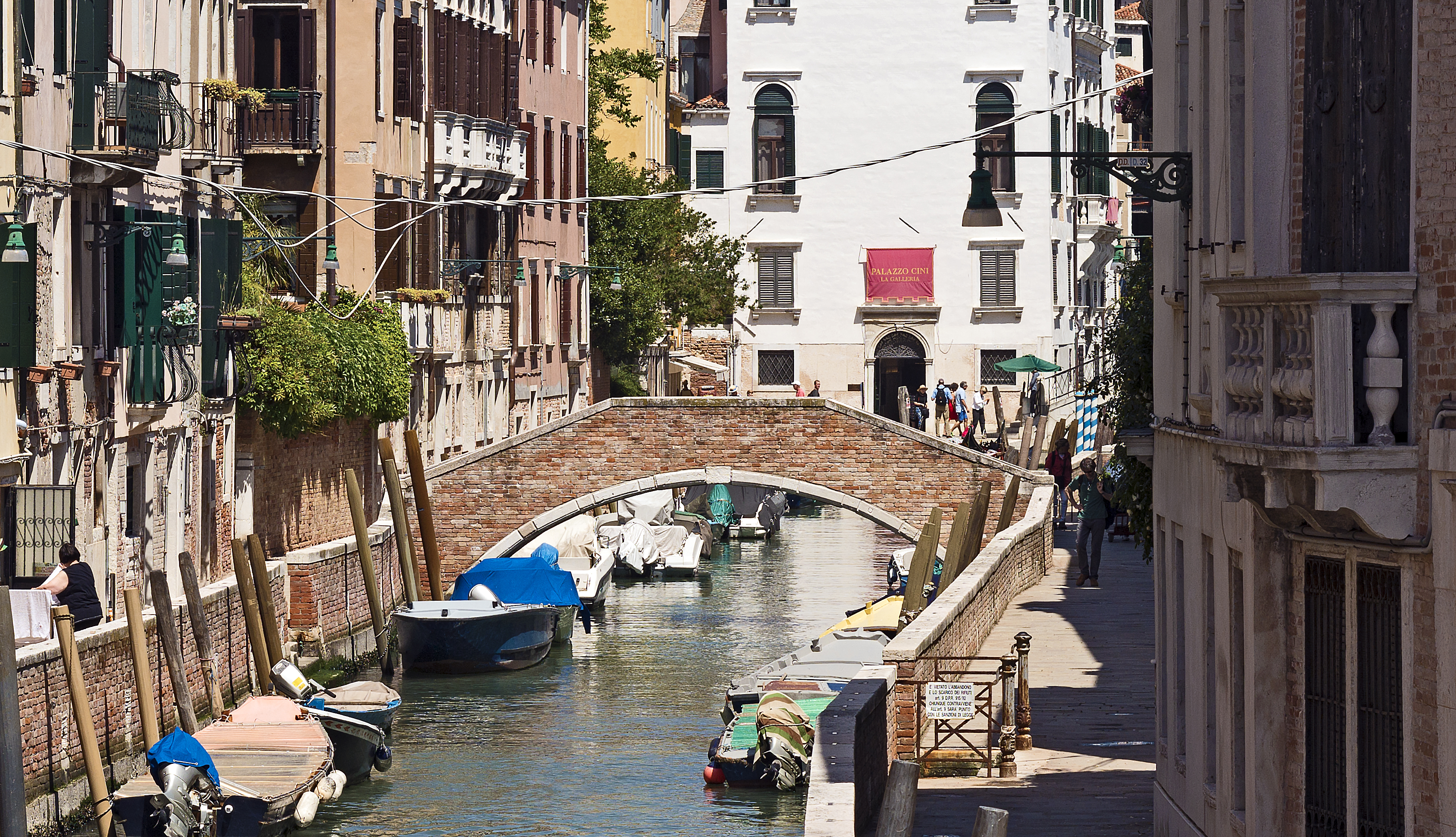
Ponte de Mezo
Rio de San Vio

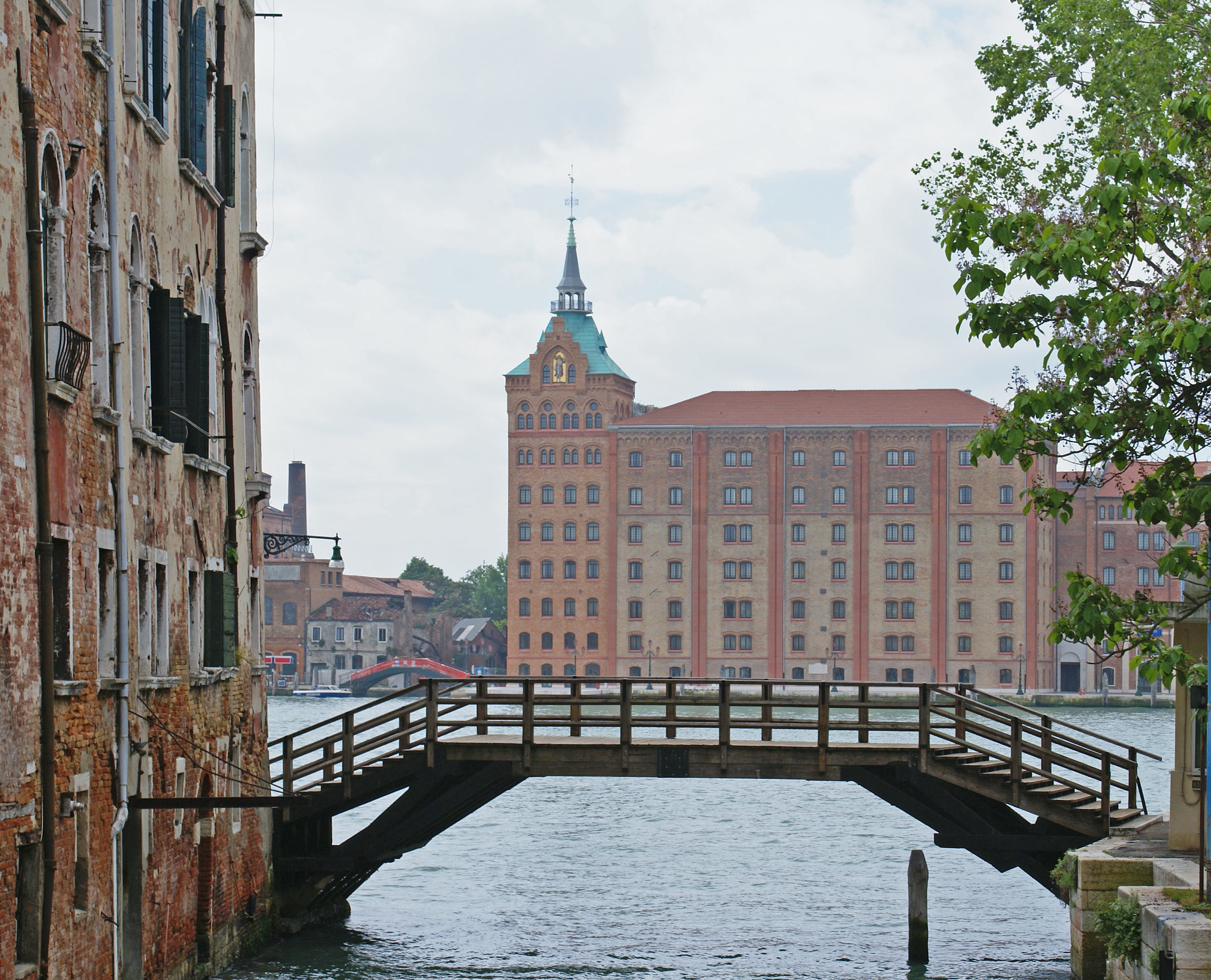
Ponte Molin
Rio de San Basegio

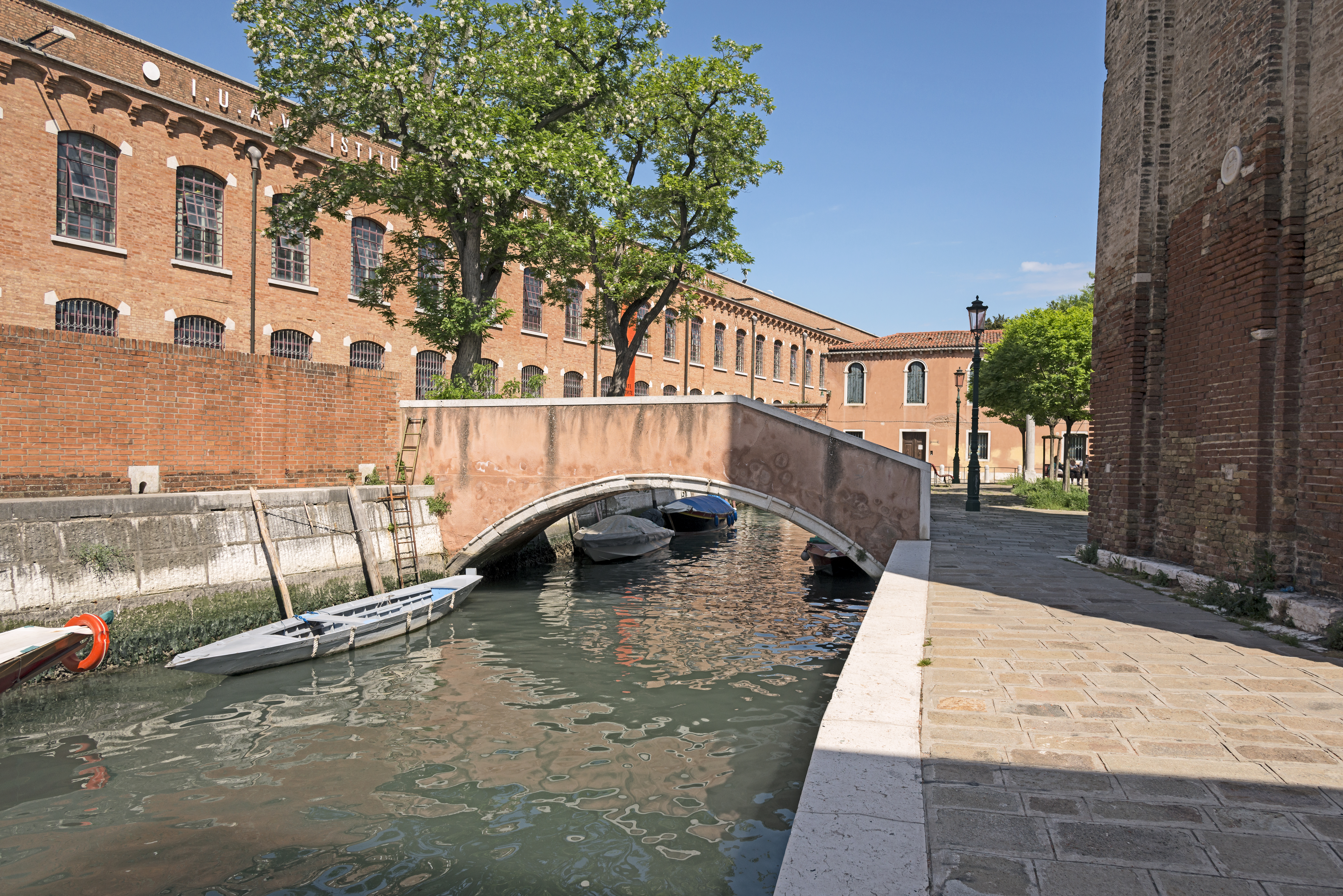
Ponte dei Morti
Rio delle Terese

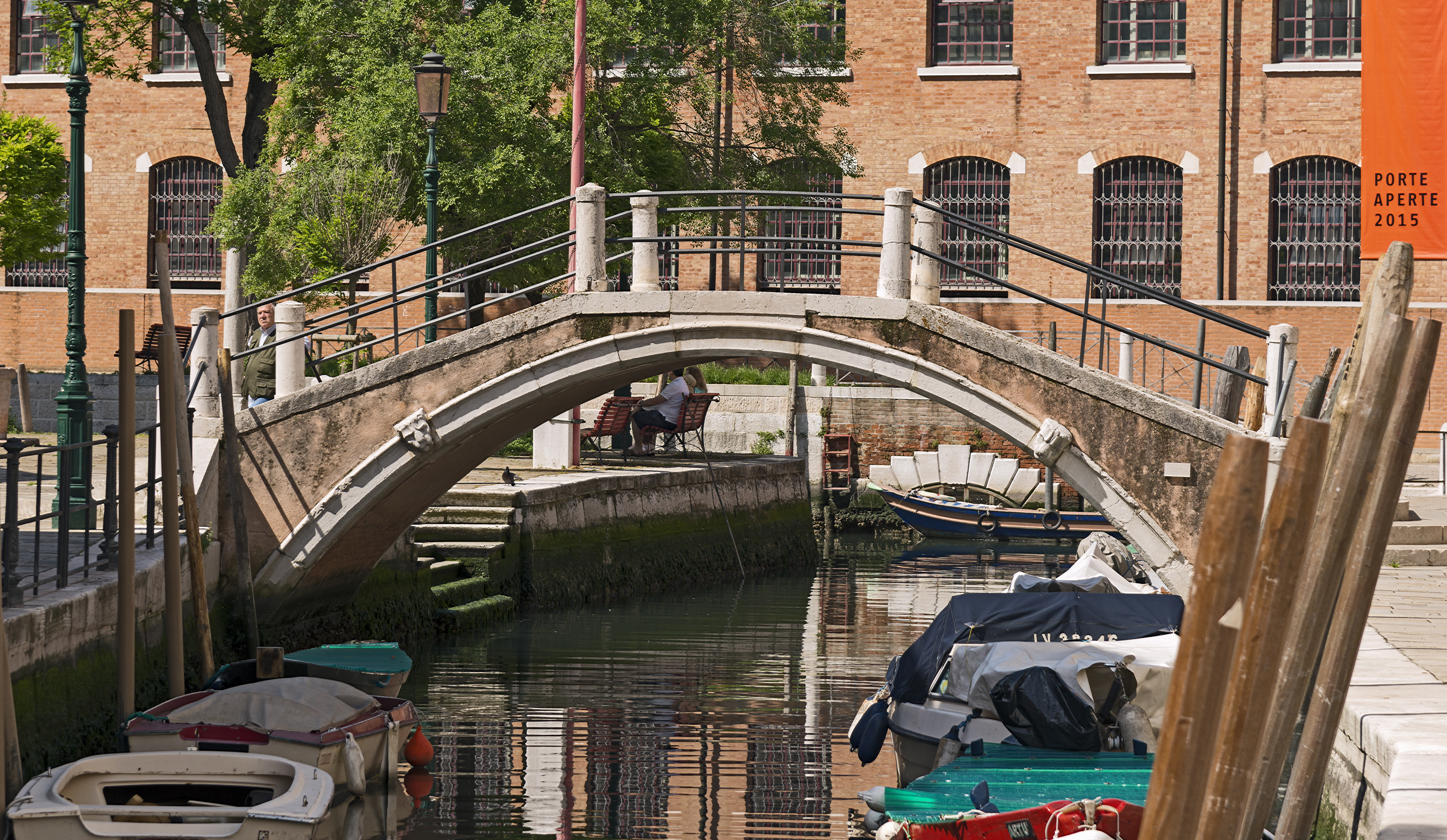
Ponte San Nicolò
Rio delle Terese

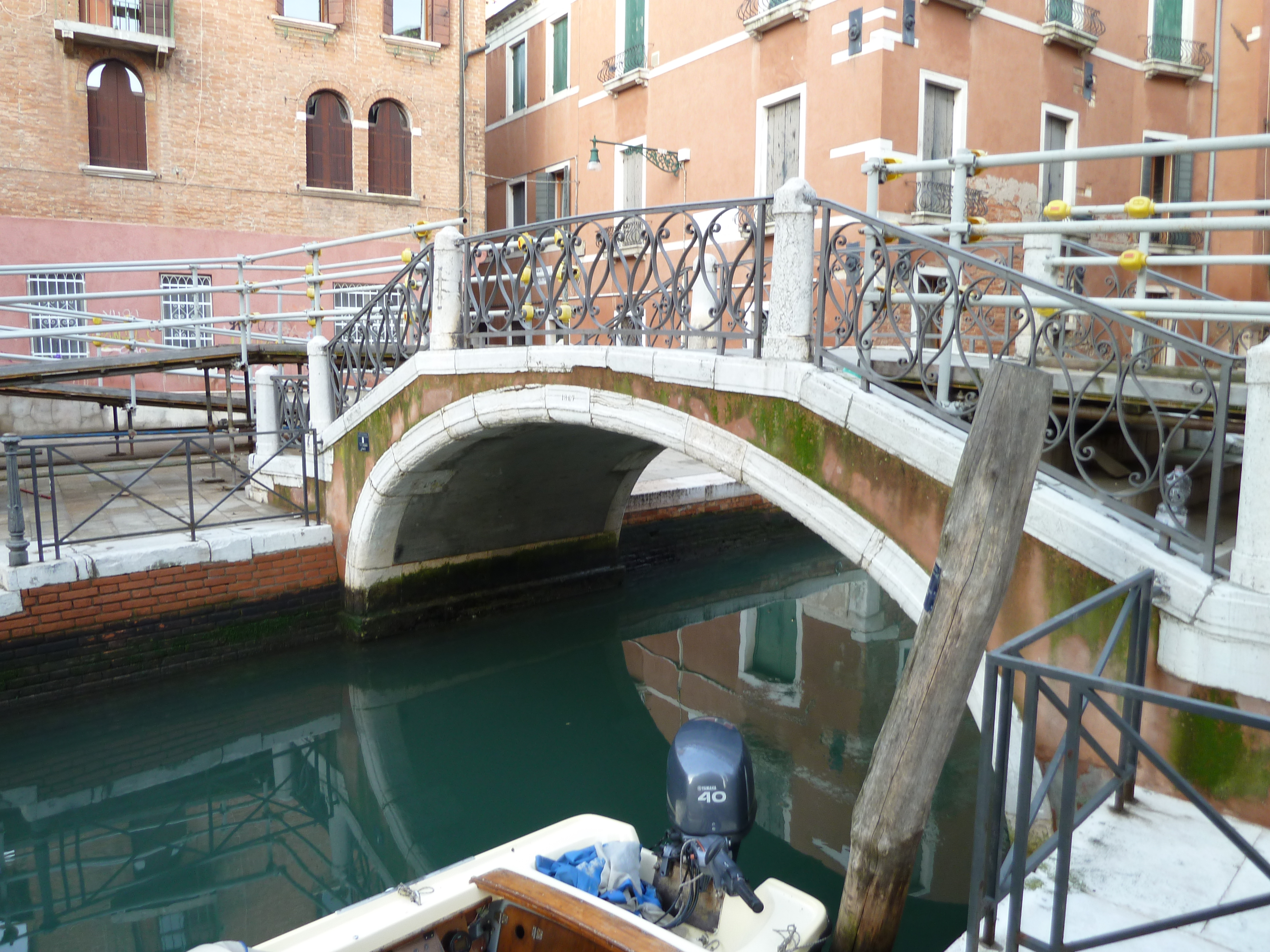
Ponte Ognissanti
Rio del Malpaga

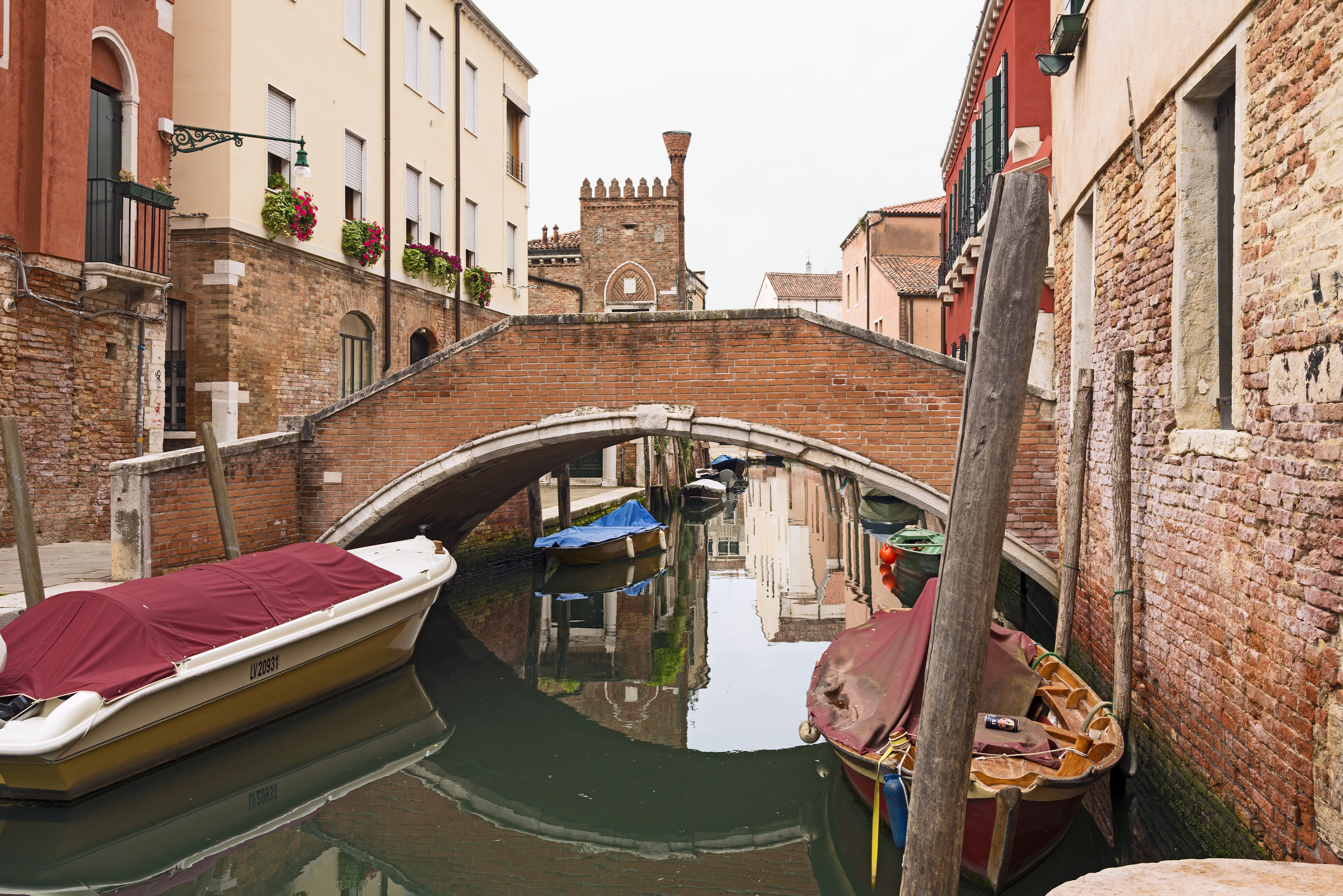
Ponte de le Pazienze
Rio de San Barnaba

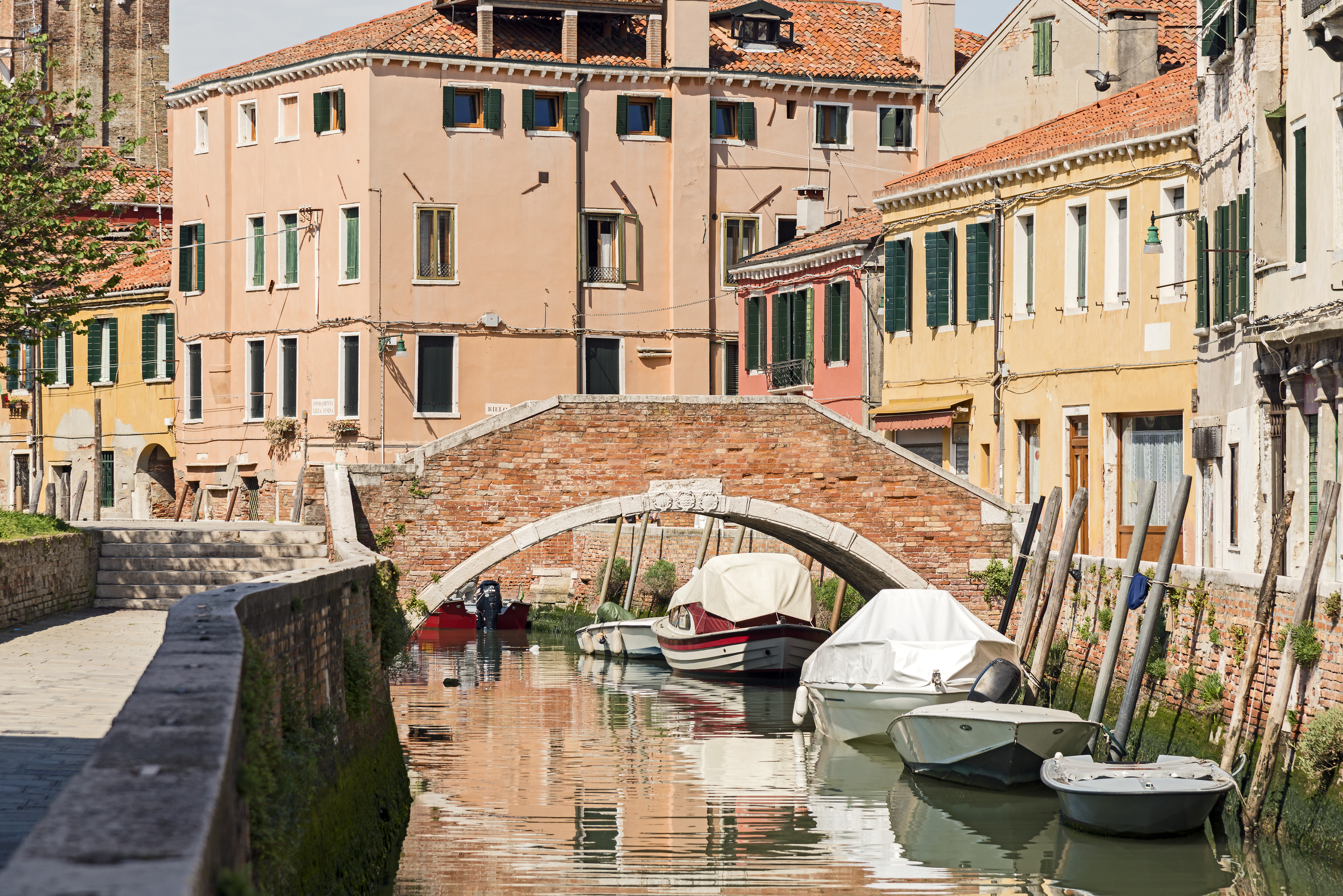
Ponte de la Piova
all'Angelo Raffaele
Rio di San Nicolo' dei Mendicoli

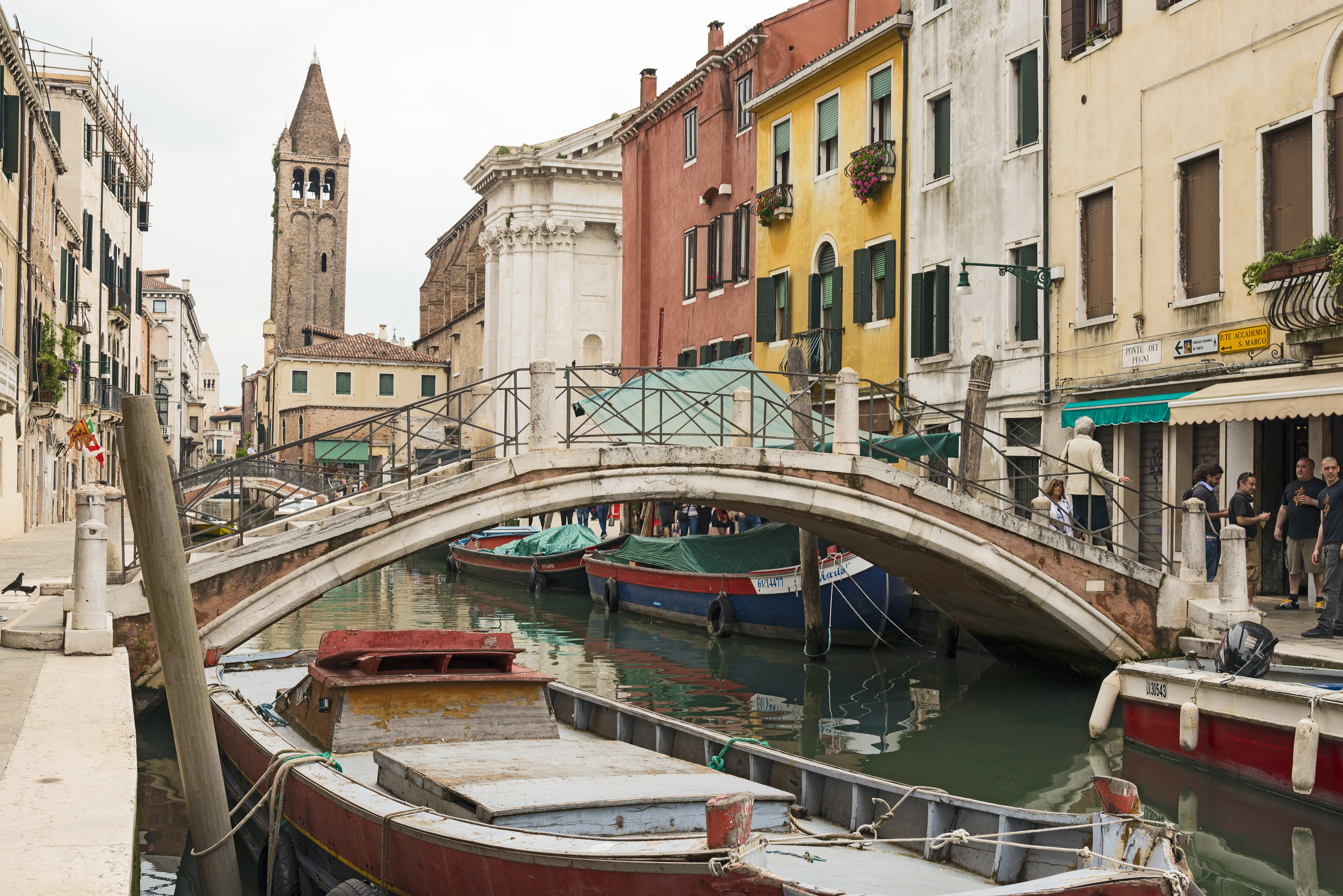
Ponte dei Pugni
Rio de San Barnaba

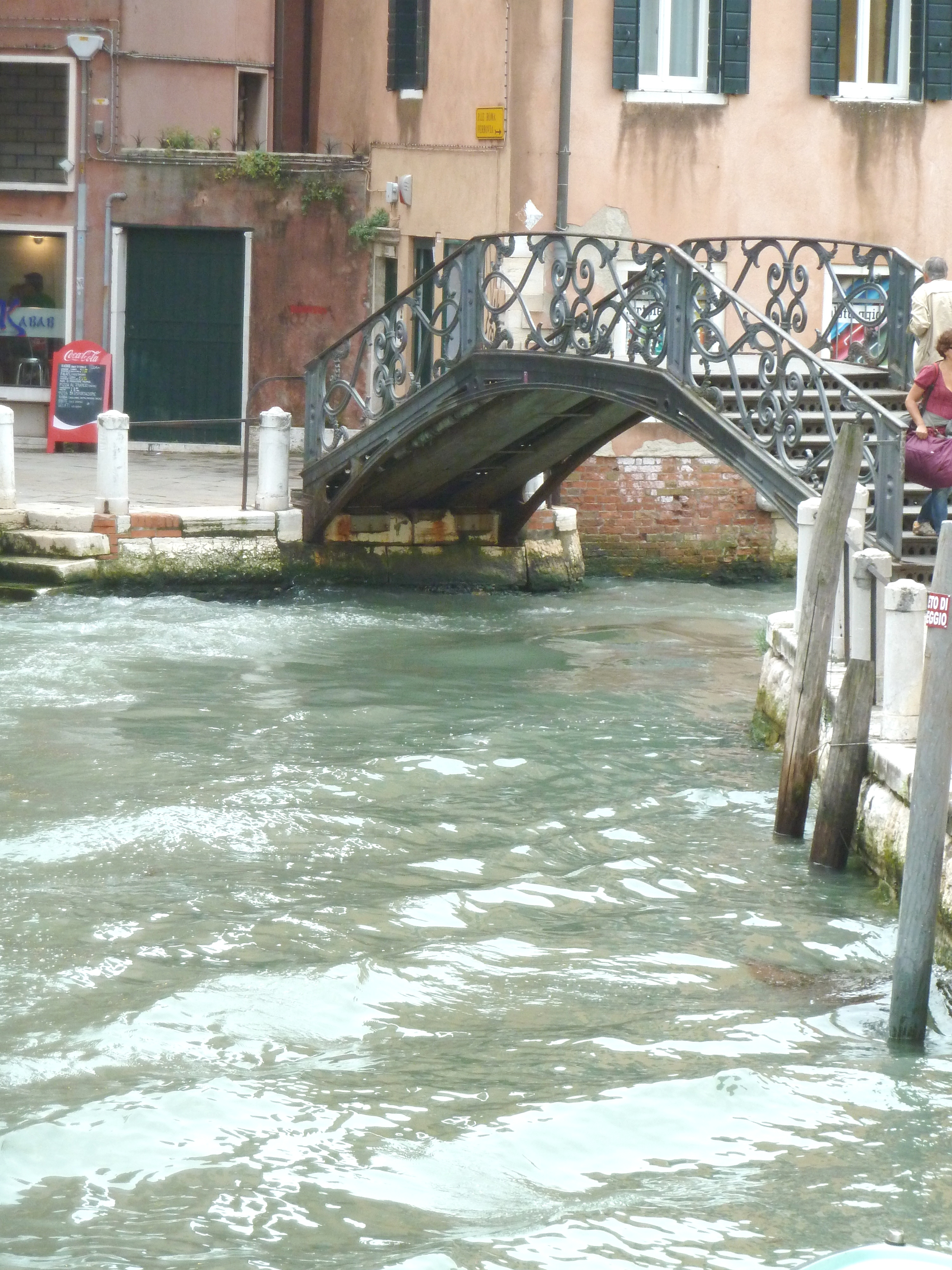
Ponte dei Ragusei
Rio del Tentor

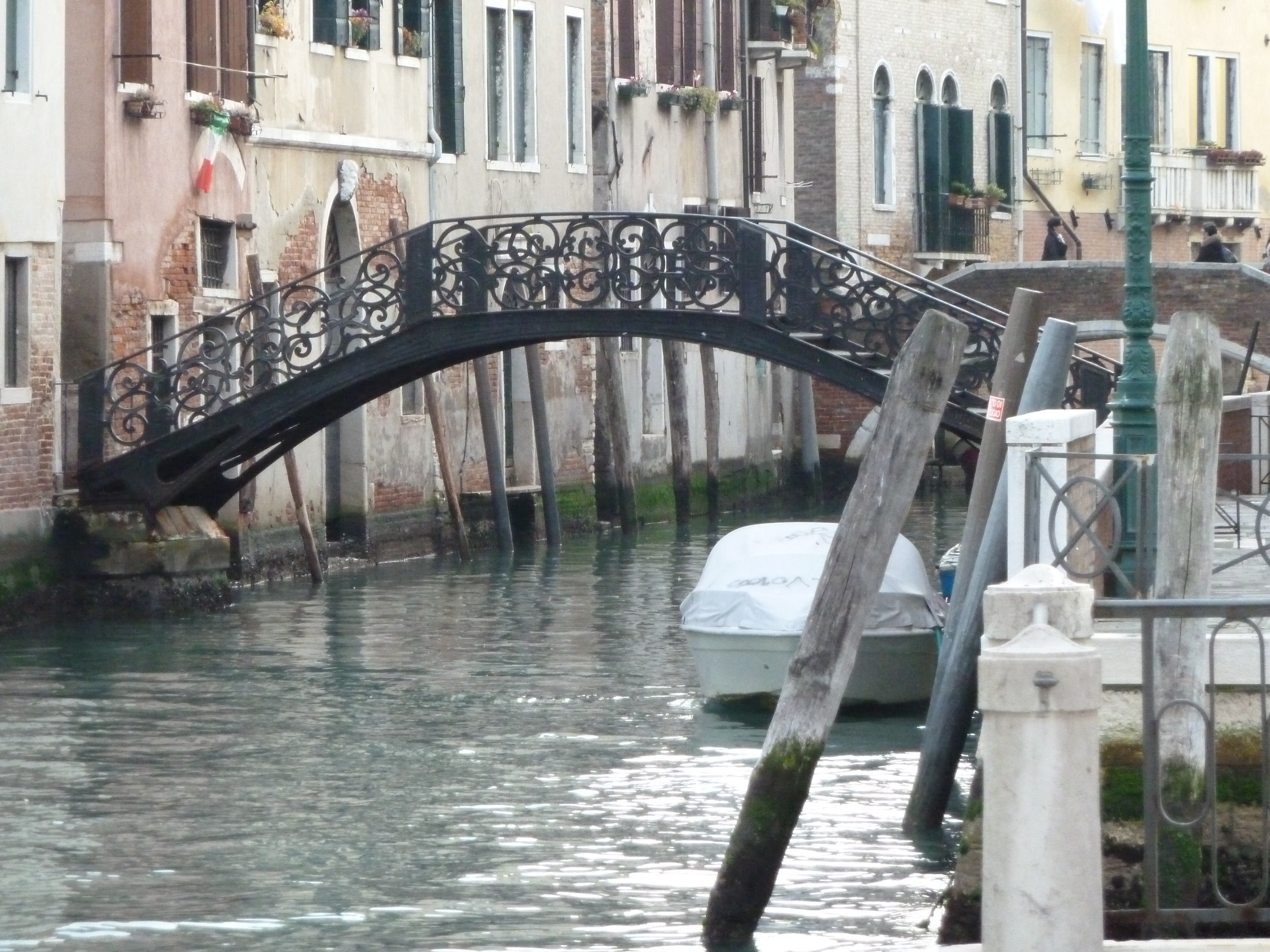
Ponte Renier
Rio de San Margarita

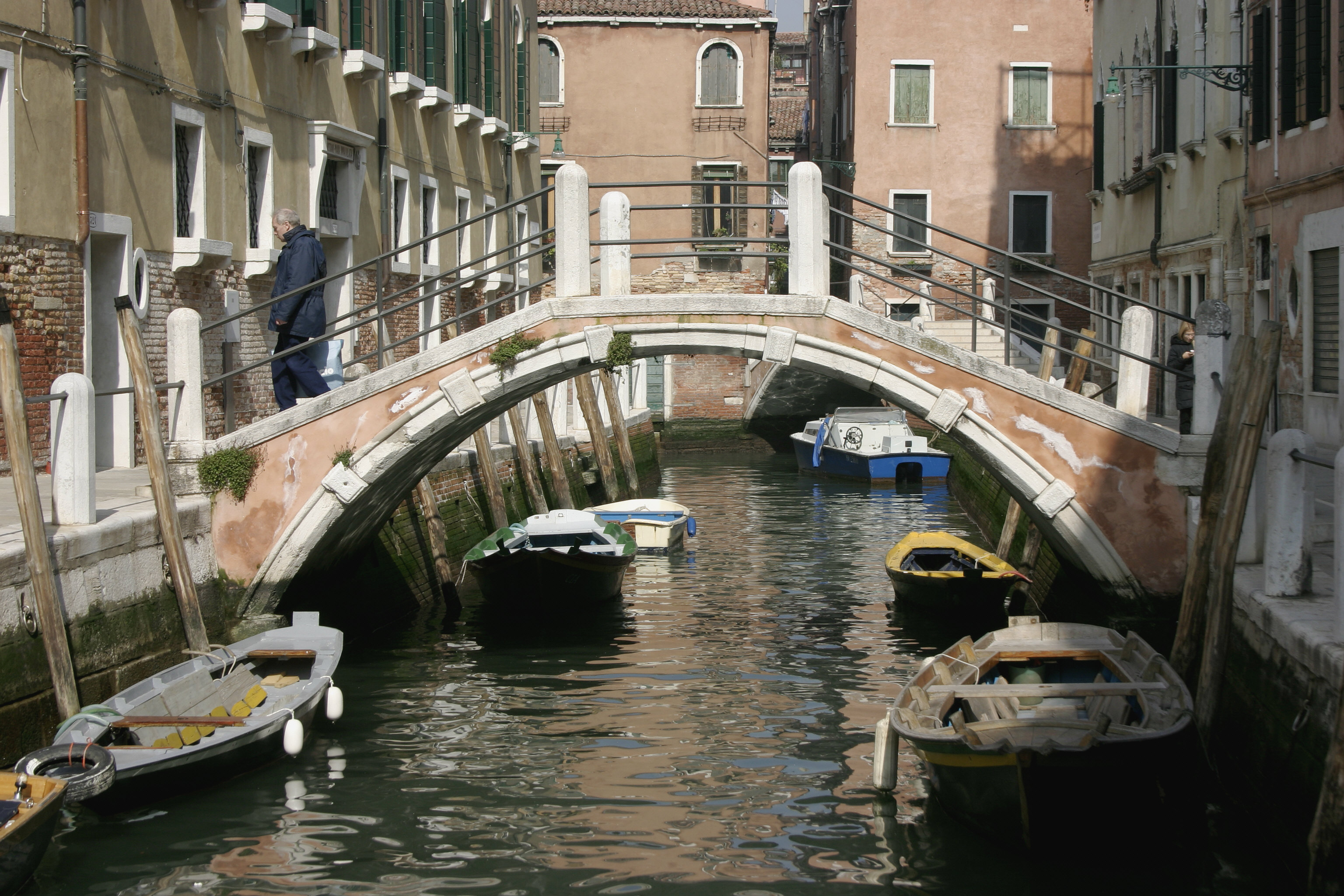
Ponte de le Romite (Eremite)
Rio de le Romite

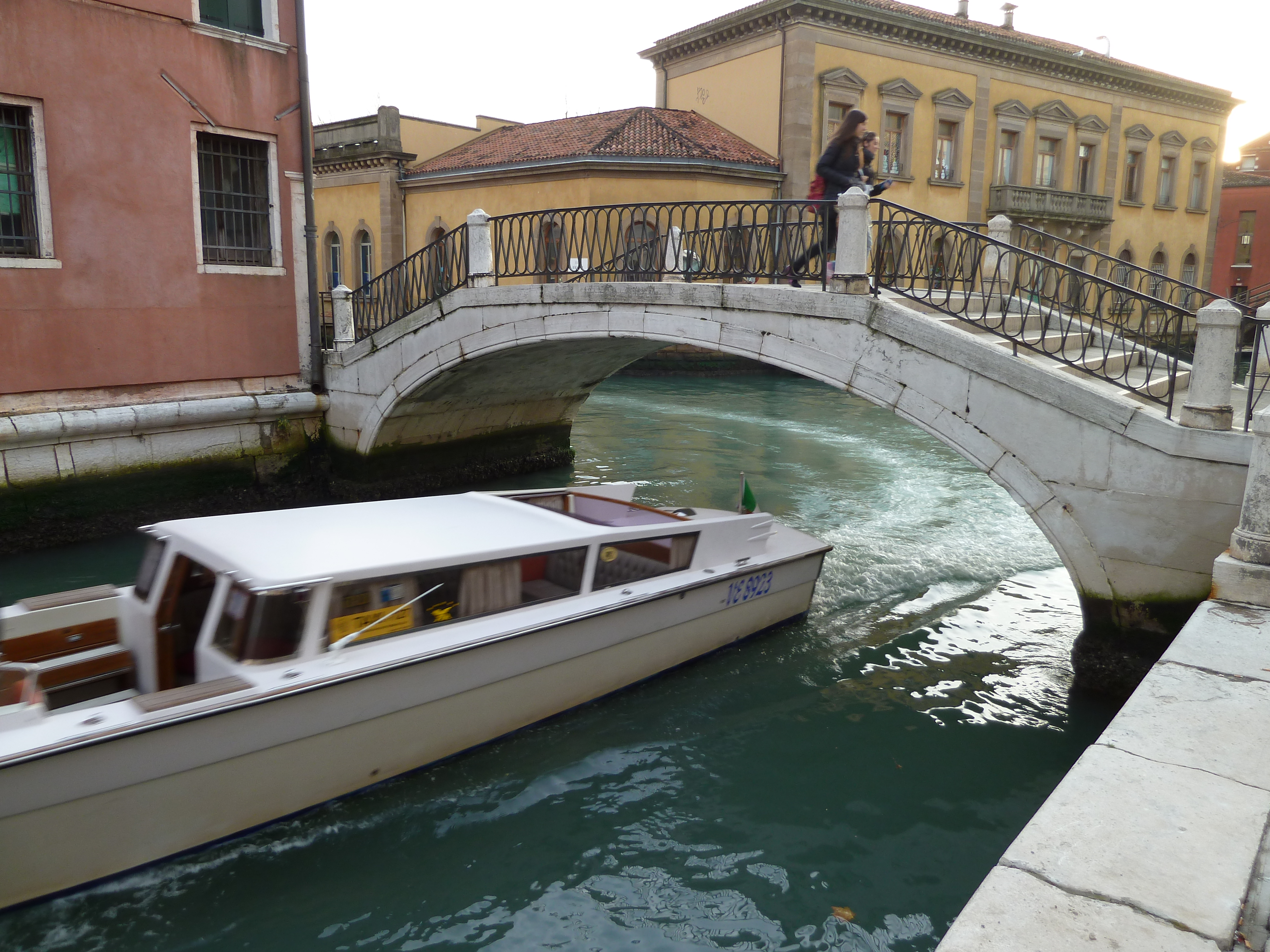
Ponte Rosso
Rio del Tentor

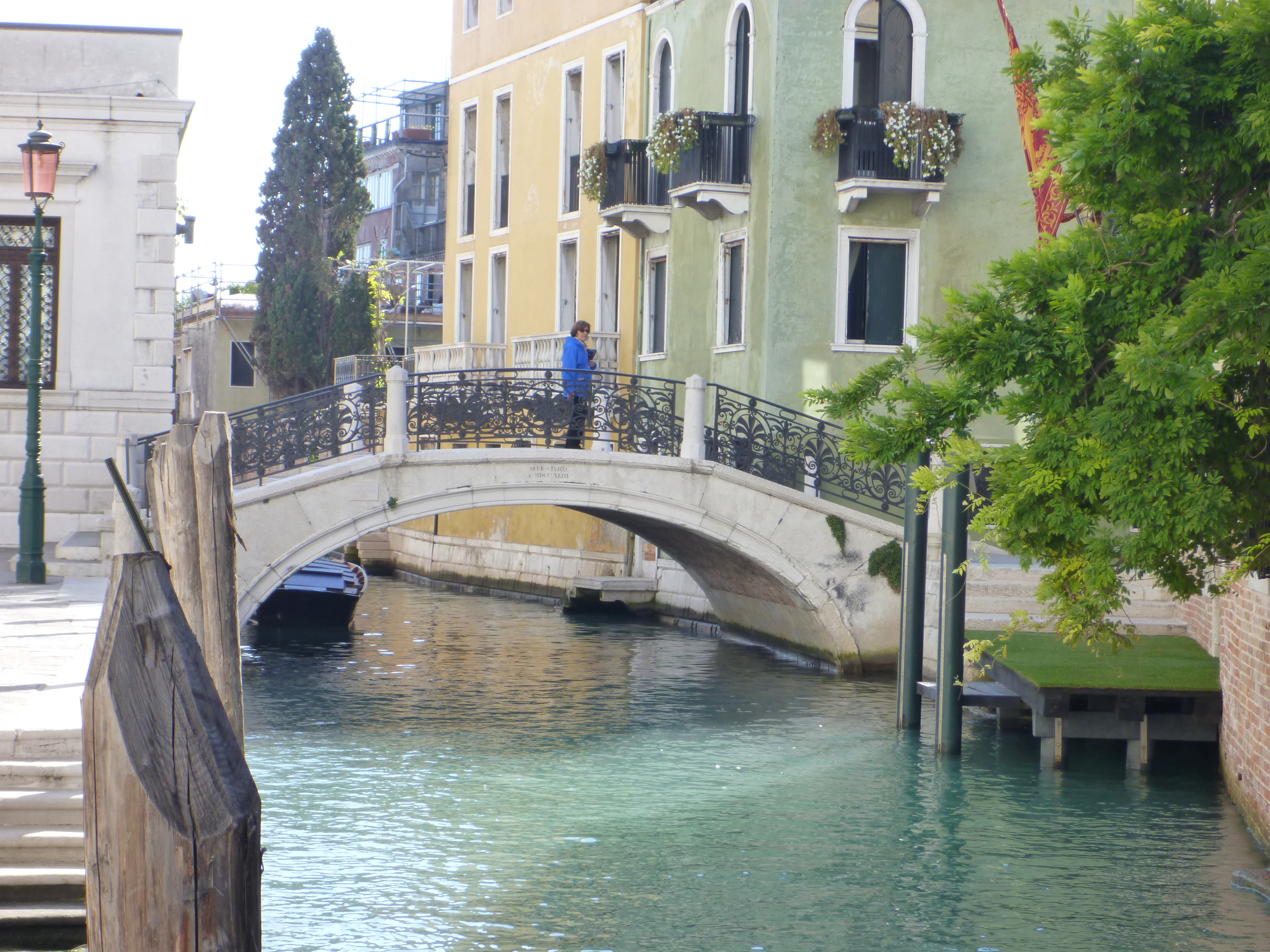
Ponte de la Salute
Rio della Salute

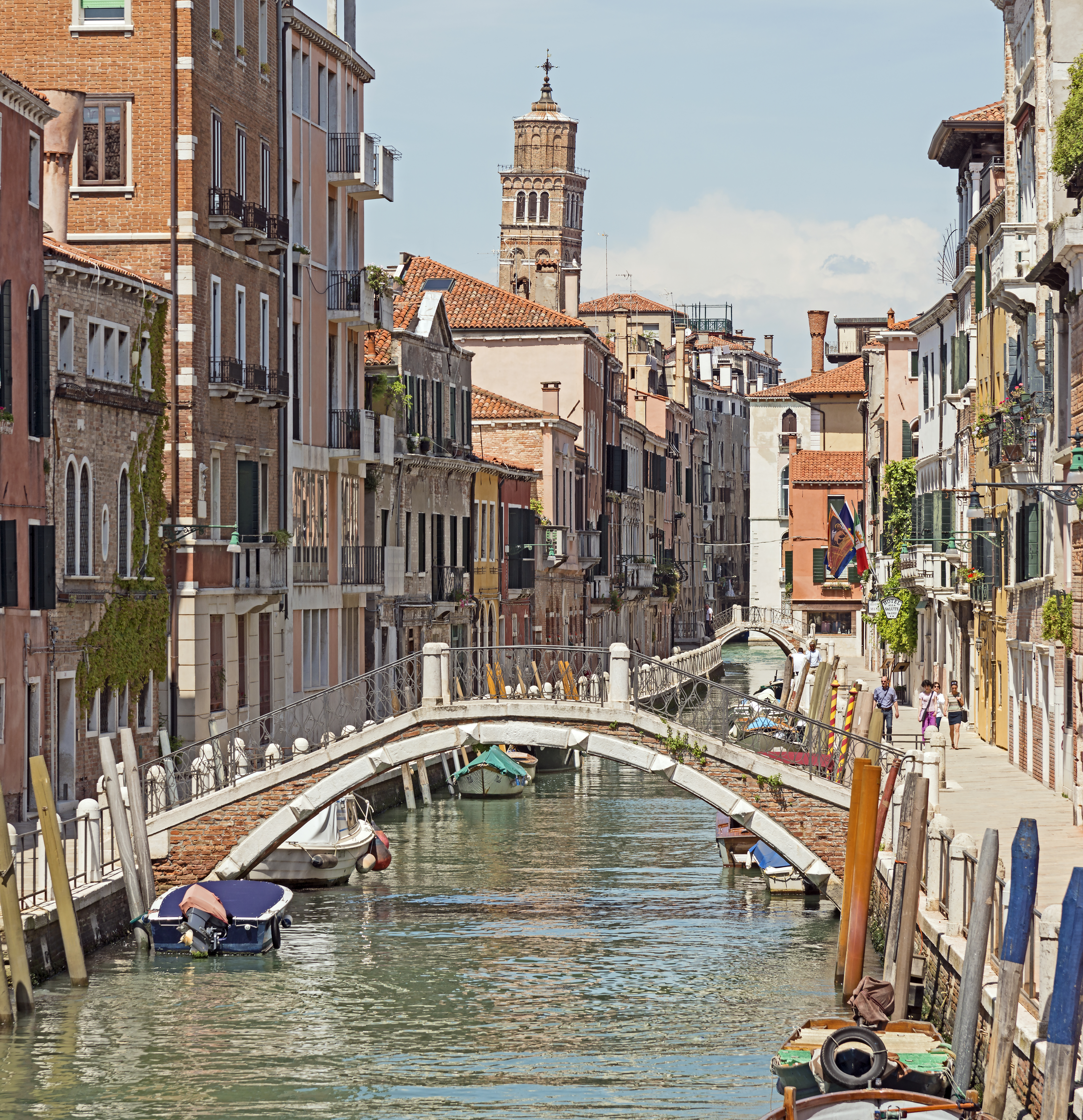
Ponte Santi/De Mezzo
Rio de la Fornace

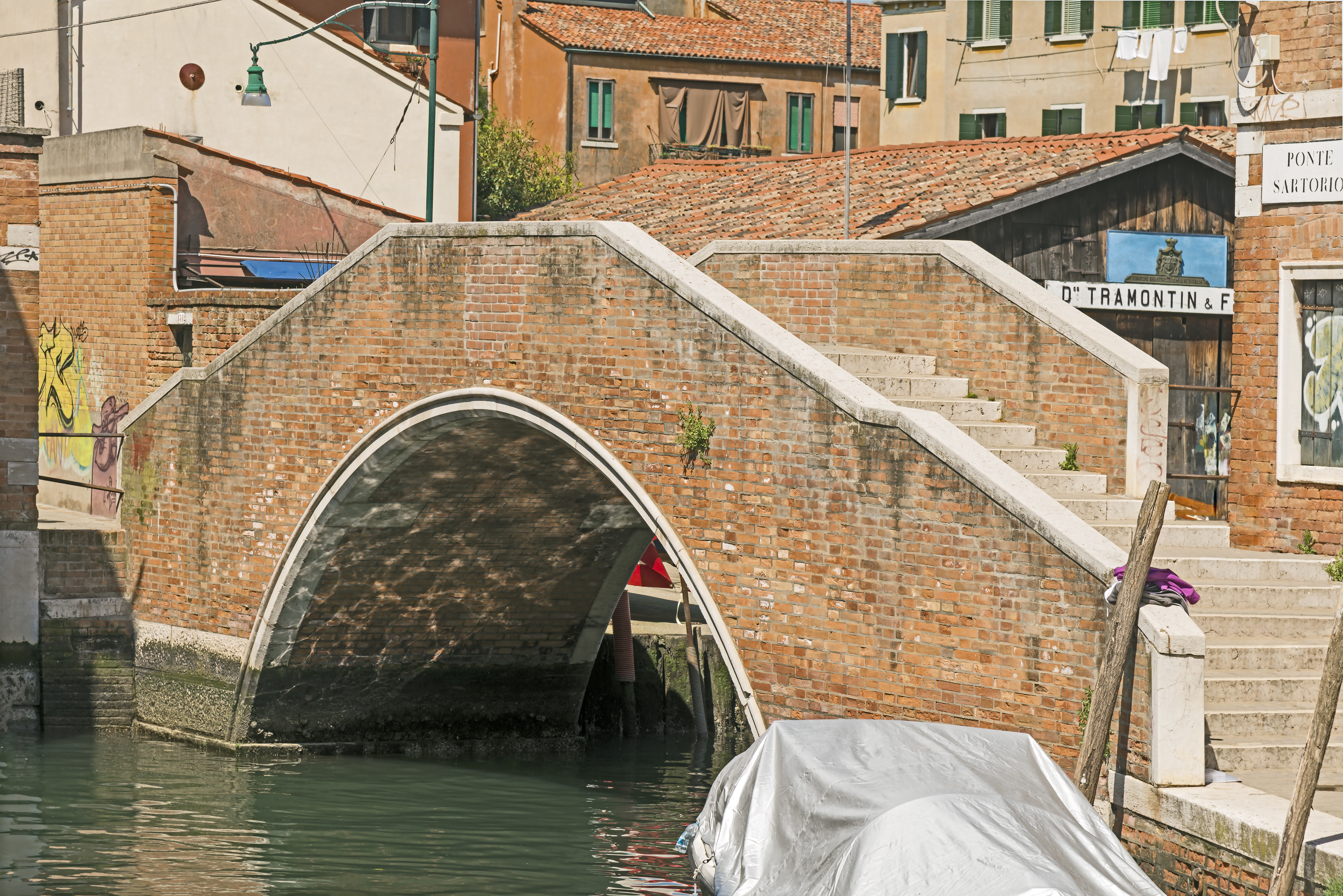
Ponte Sartorio
Rio dei Ognissanti - Rio de l'Avogaria

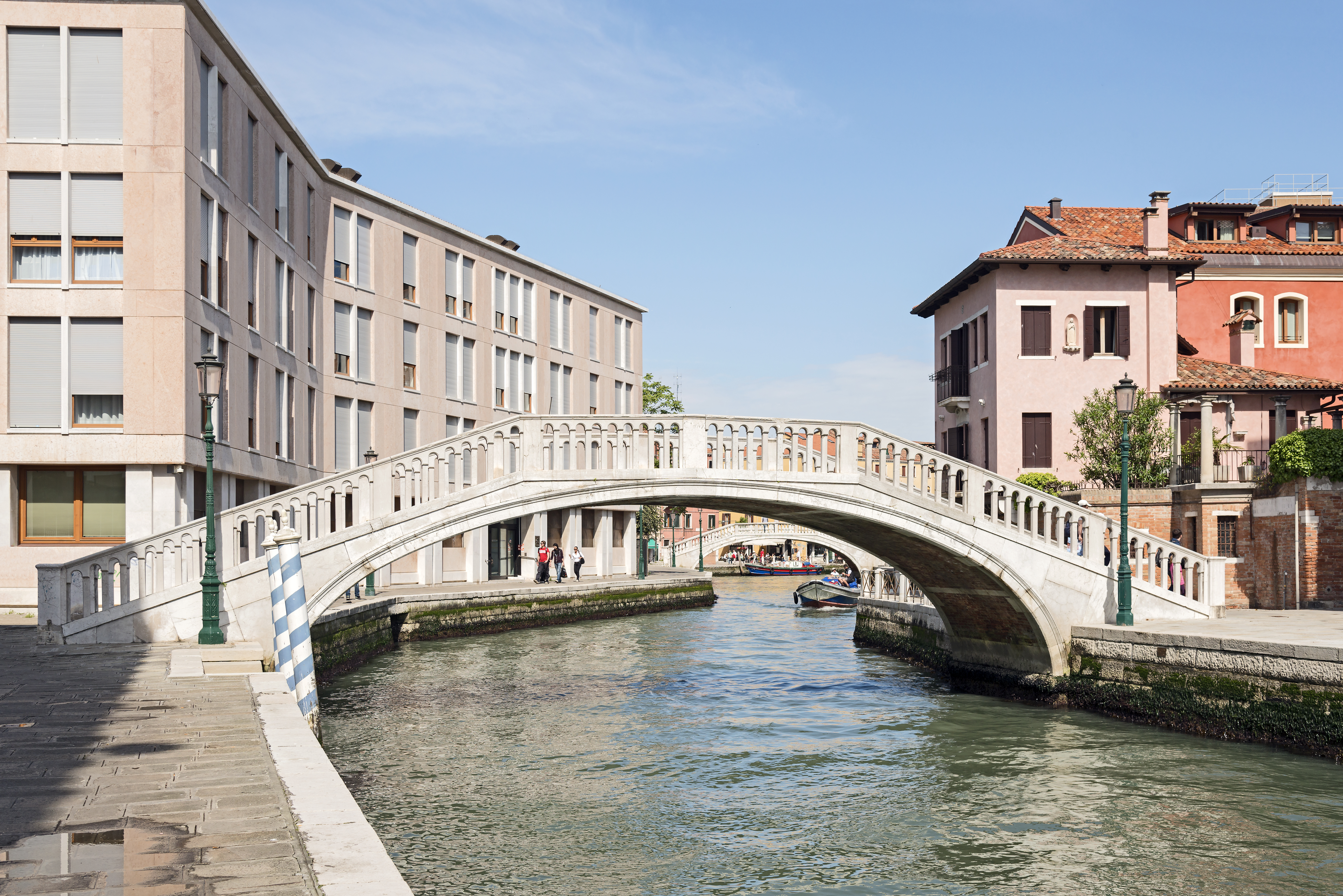
Ponte de la Sbiaca
Rio Novo (Venise)

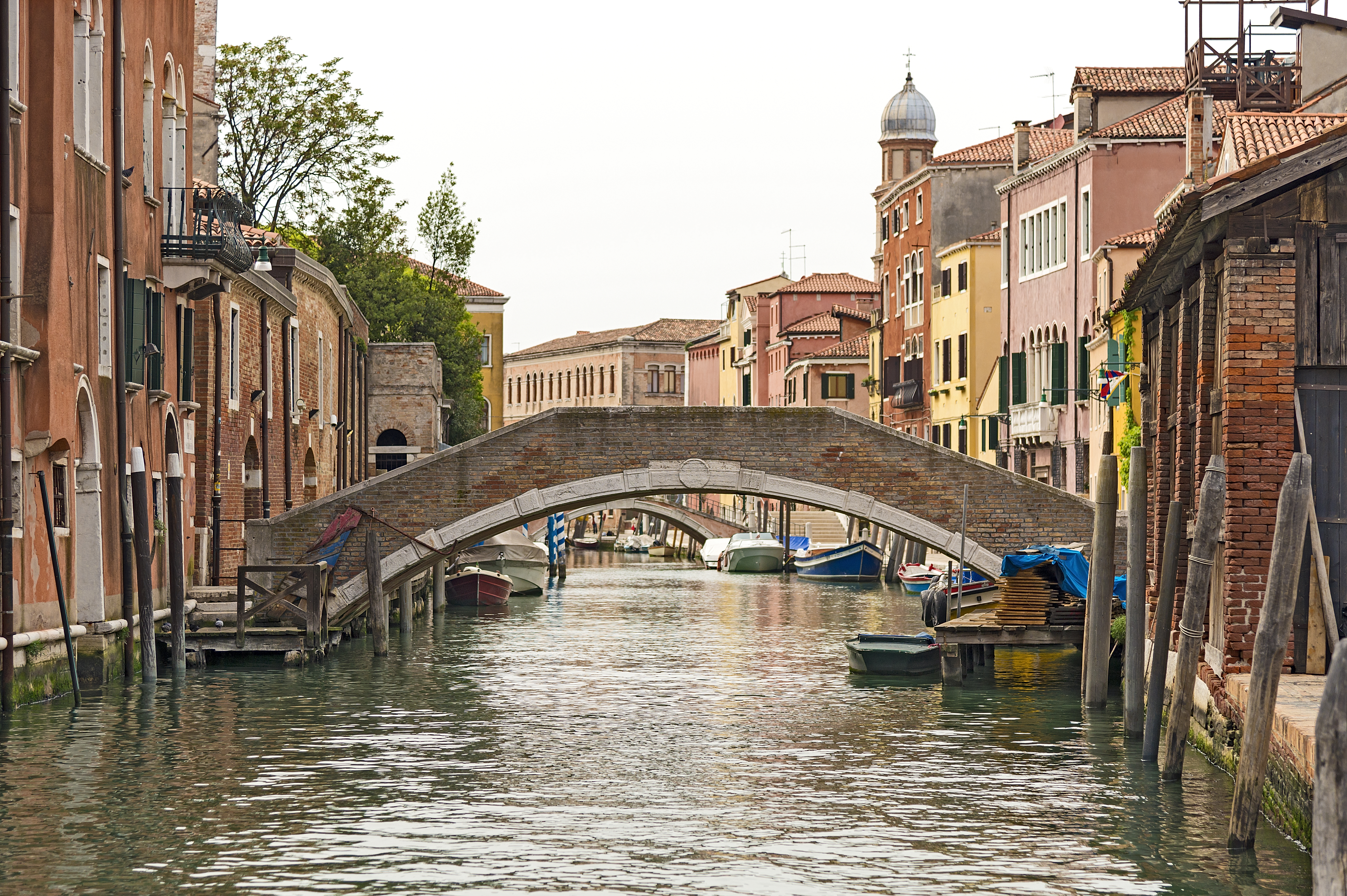
Ponte de la Scoazera
Rio dei Ognissanti

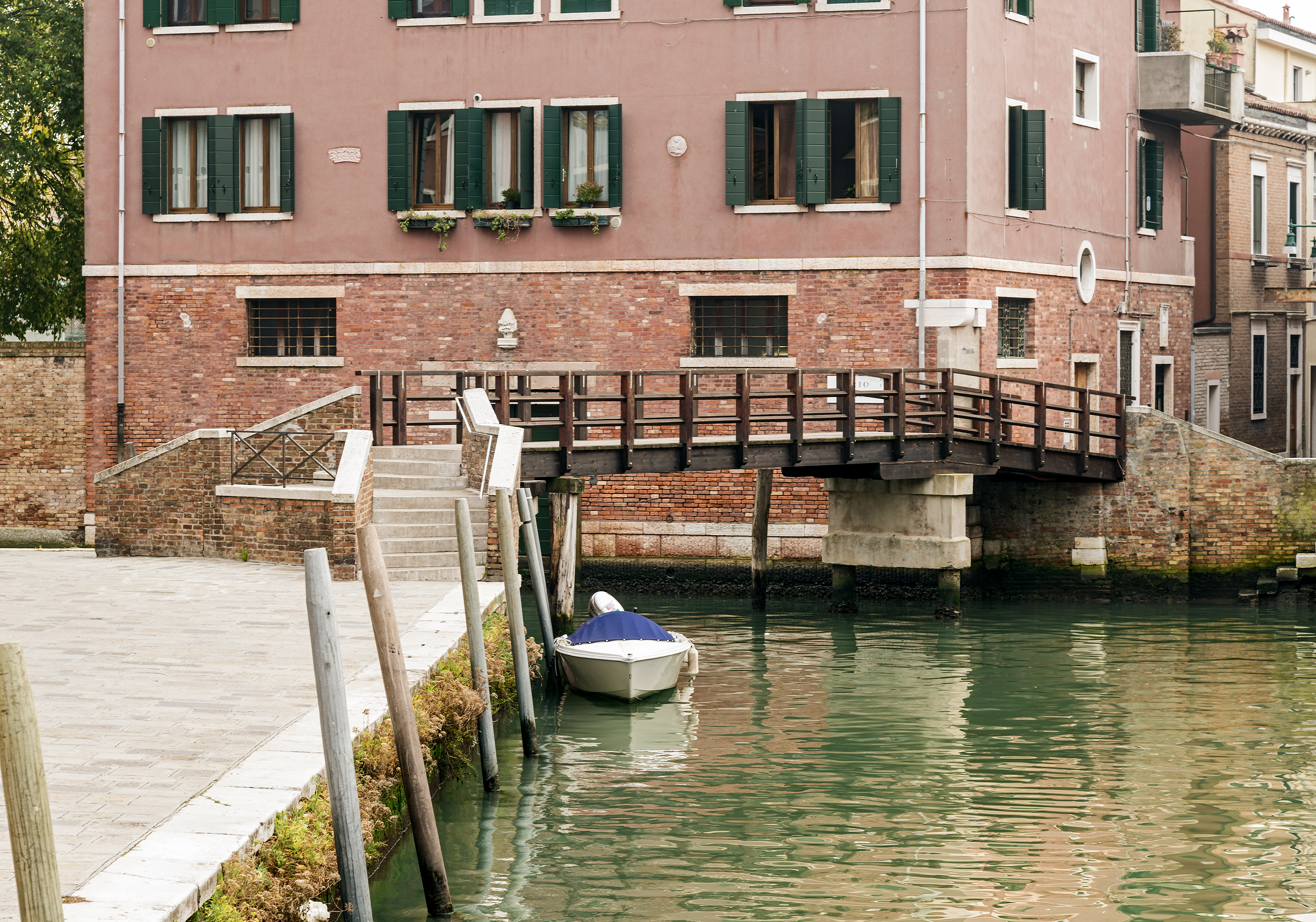
Ponte Storto
Rio del Tentor

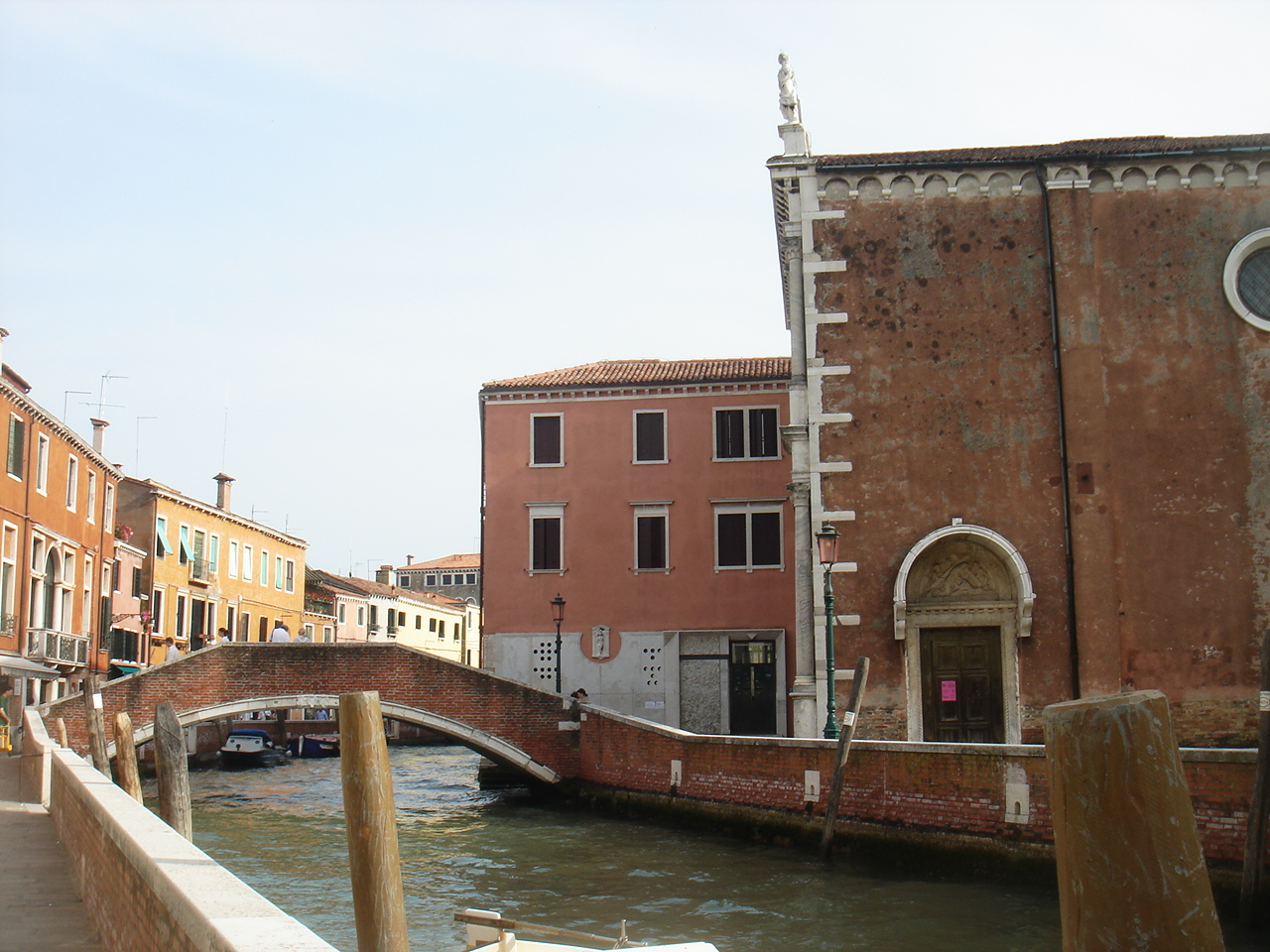
Ponte San Sebastian(o)
Rio de San Basegio

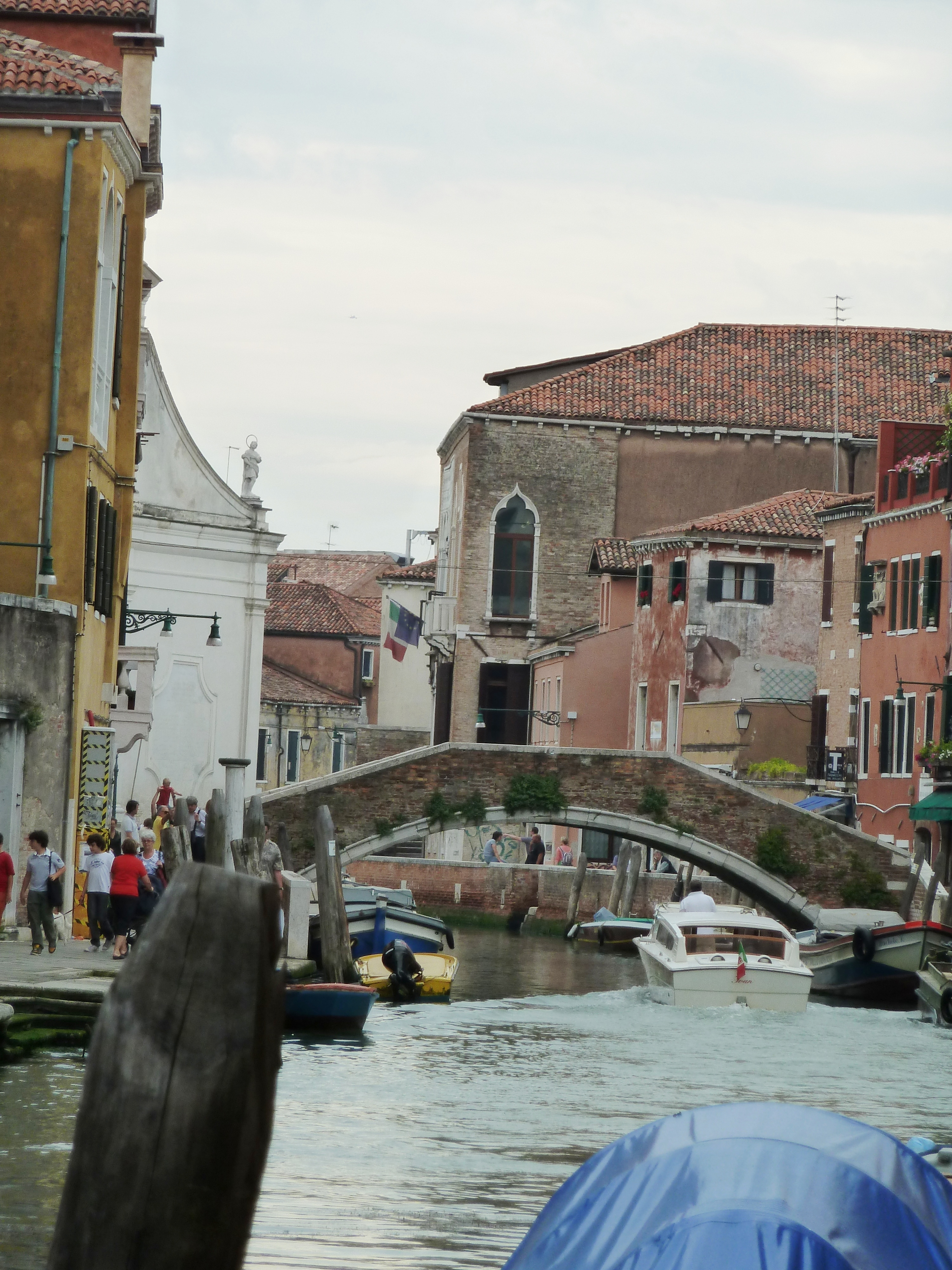
Ponte del Soccorso
Rio dei Carmini

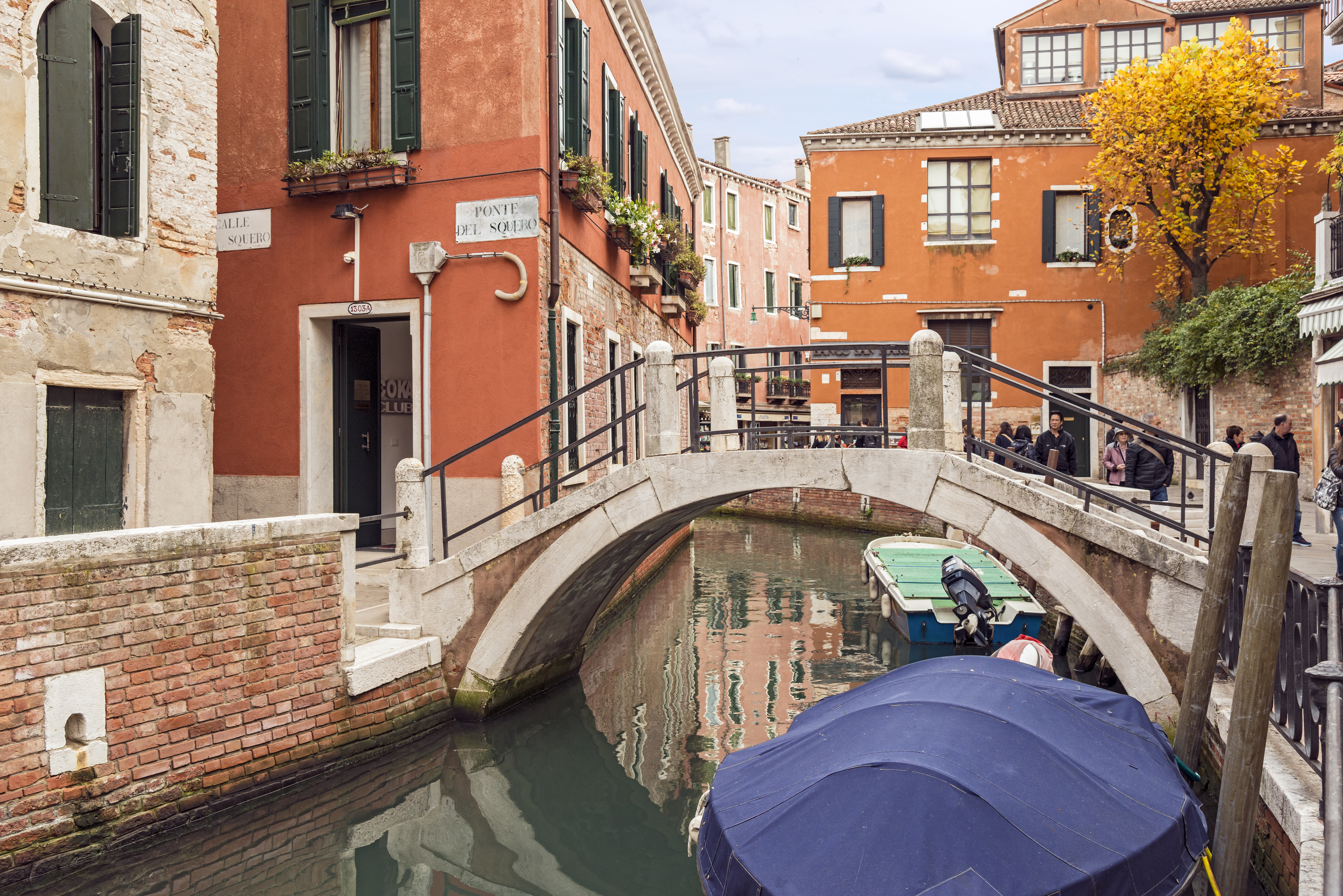
Ponte del Squero
Rio de la Toletta

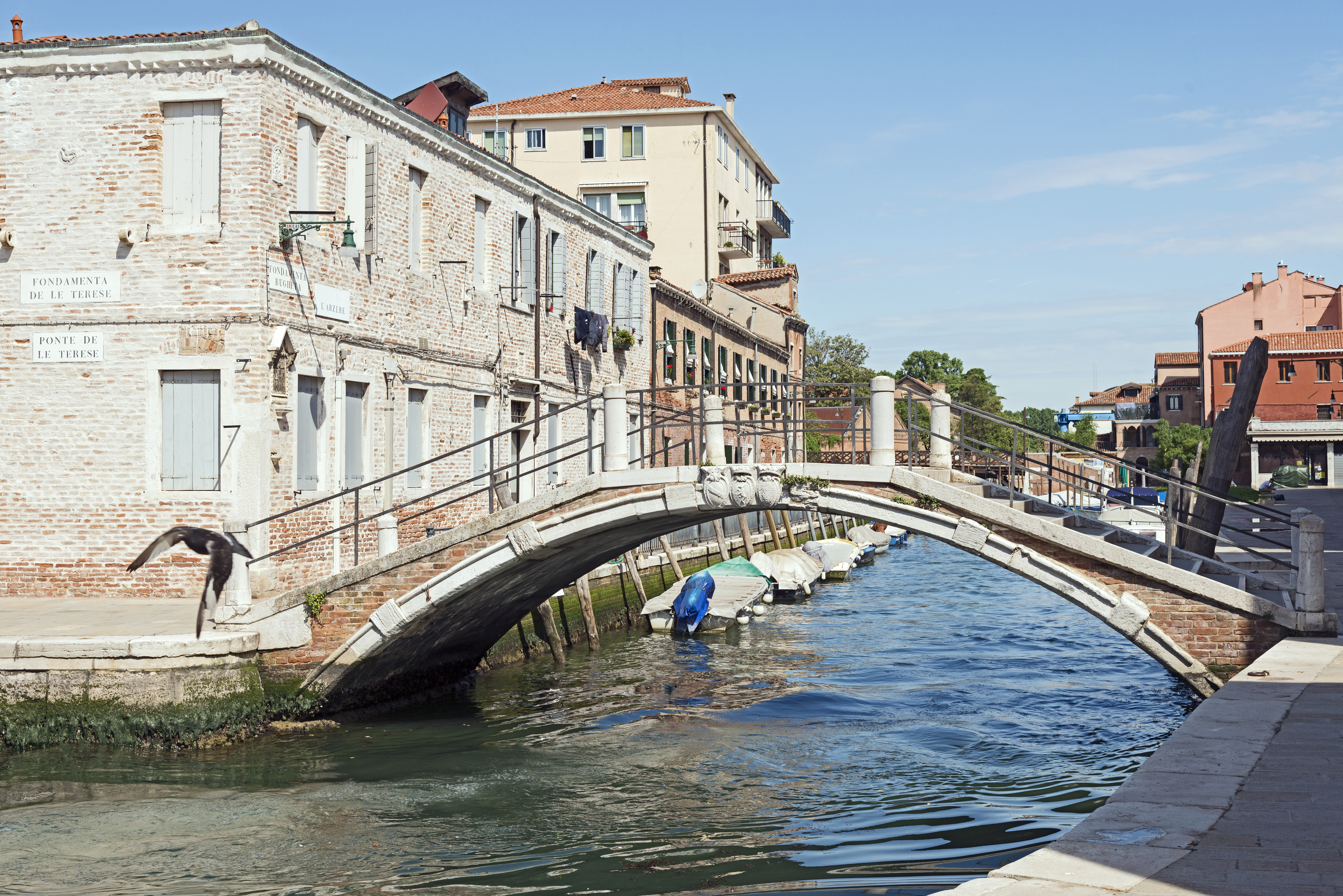
Ponte de le Terese
Rio del'Arzere Rio de le Terese

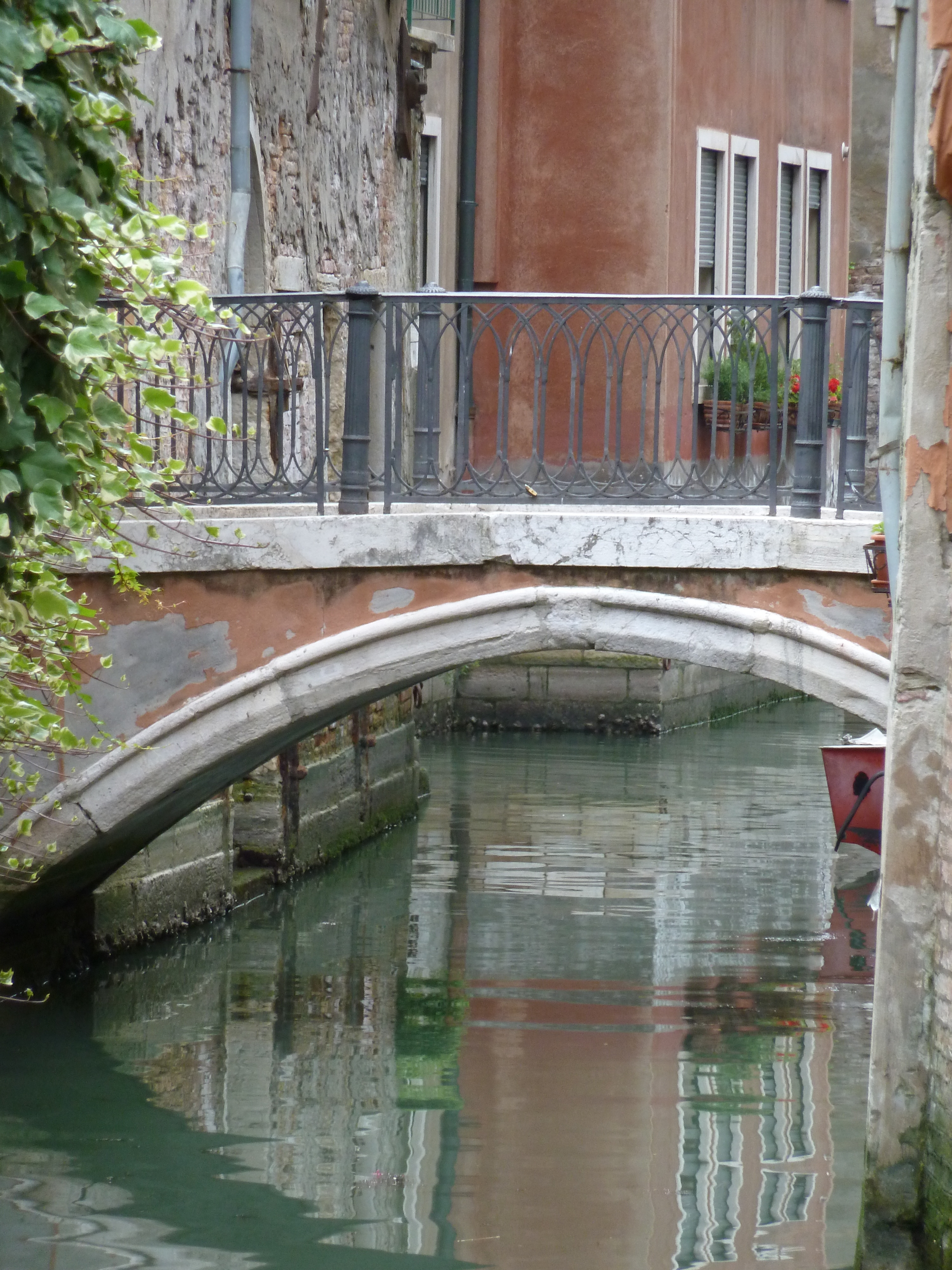
Ponte de la Toleta
Rio de la Toletta

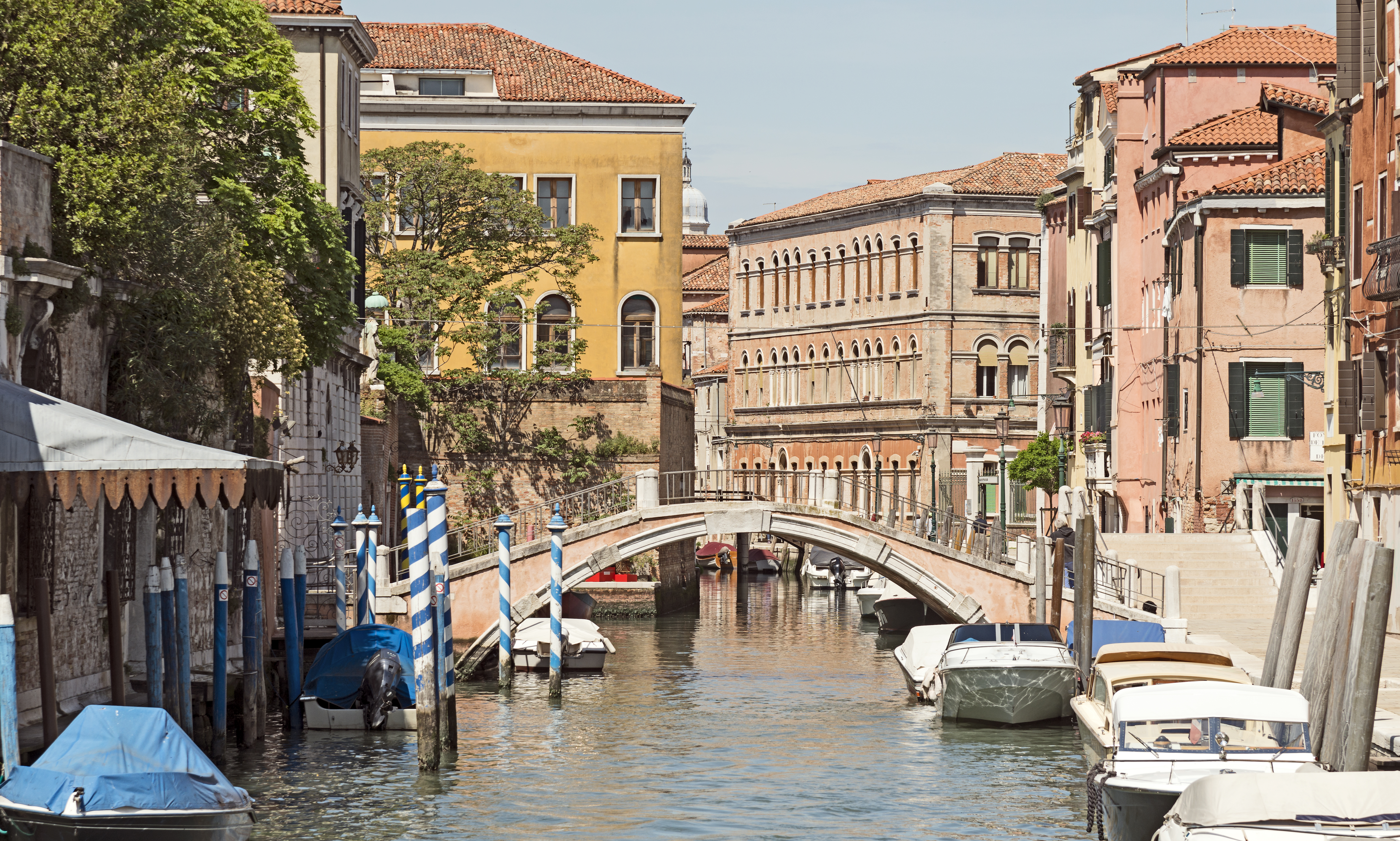
Ponte Trevisan
Rio dei Ognissanti

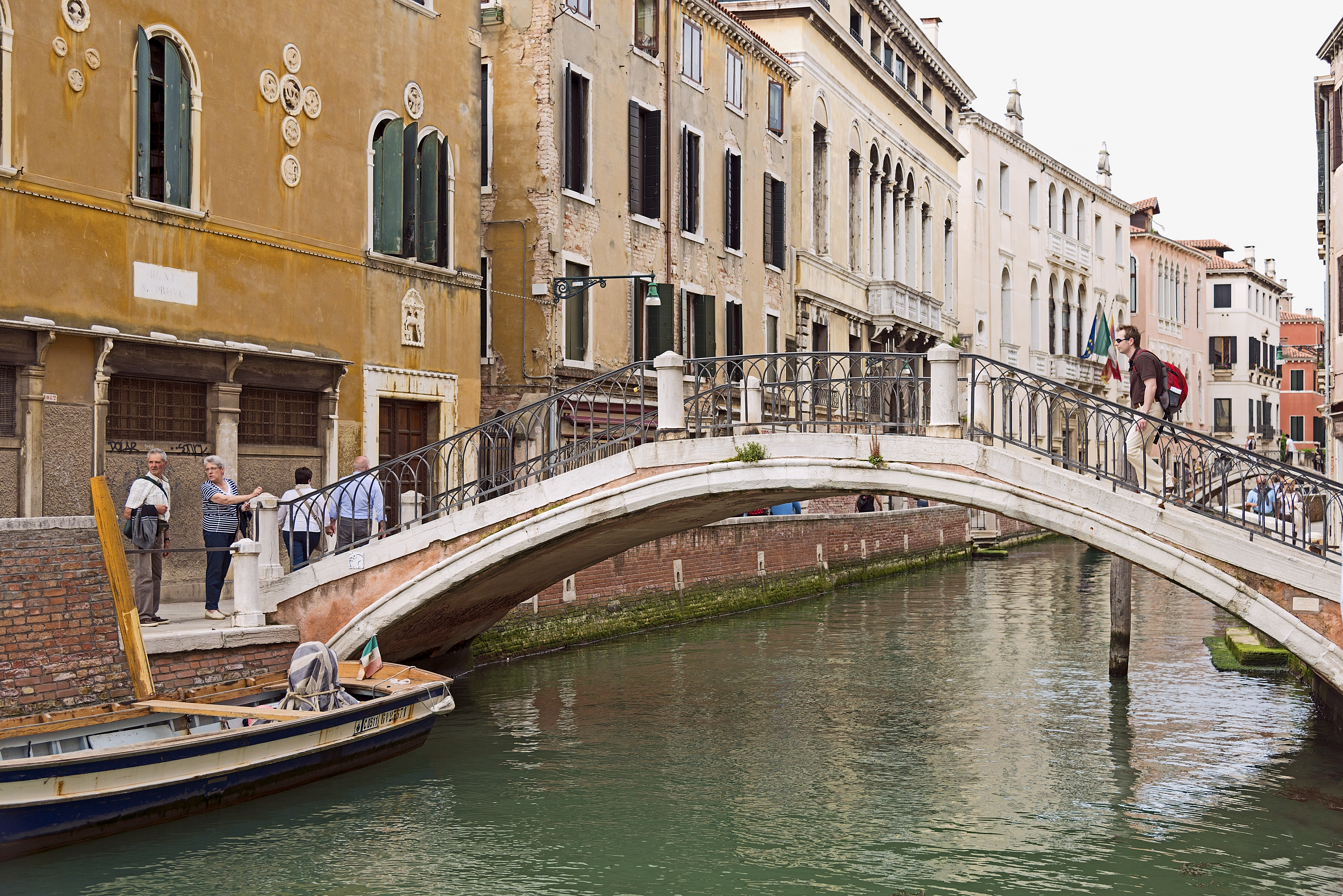
Ponte San Trovaso
Rio de San Trovaso

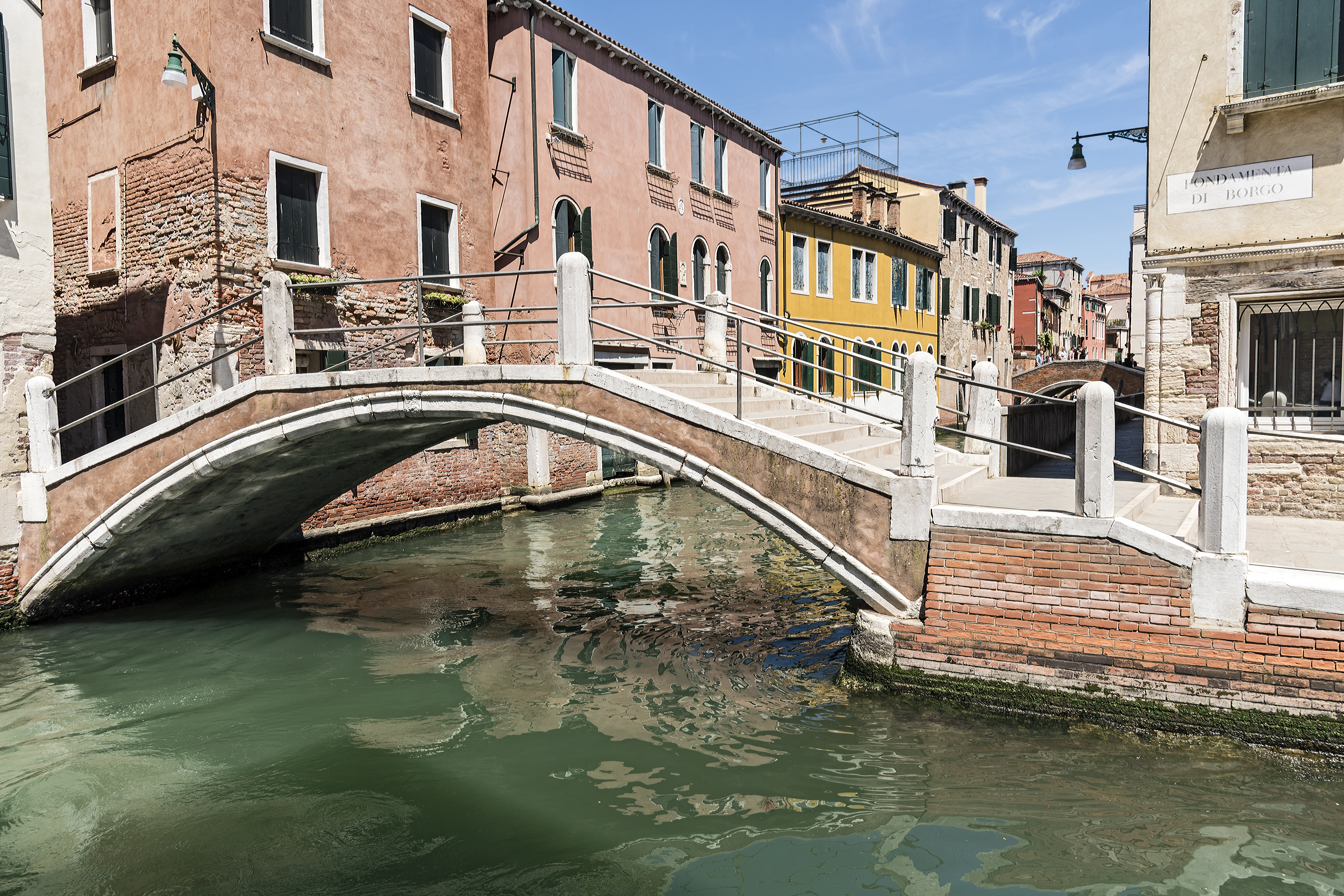
Ponte de le Turchette
Rio del Malpaga

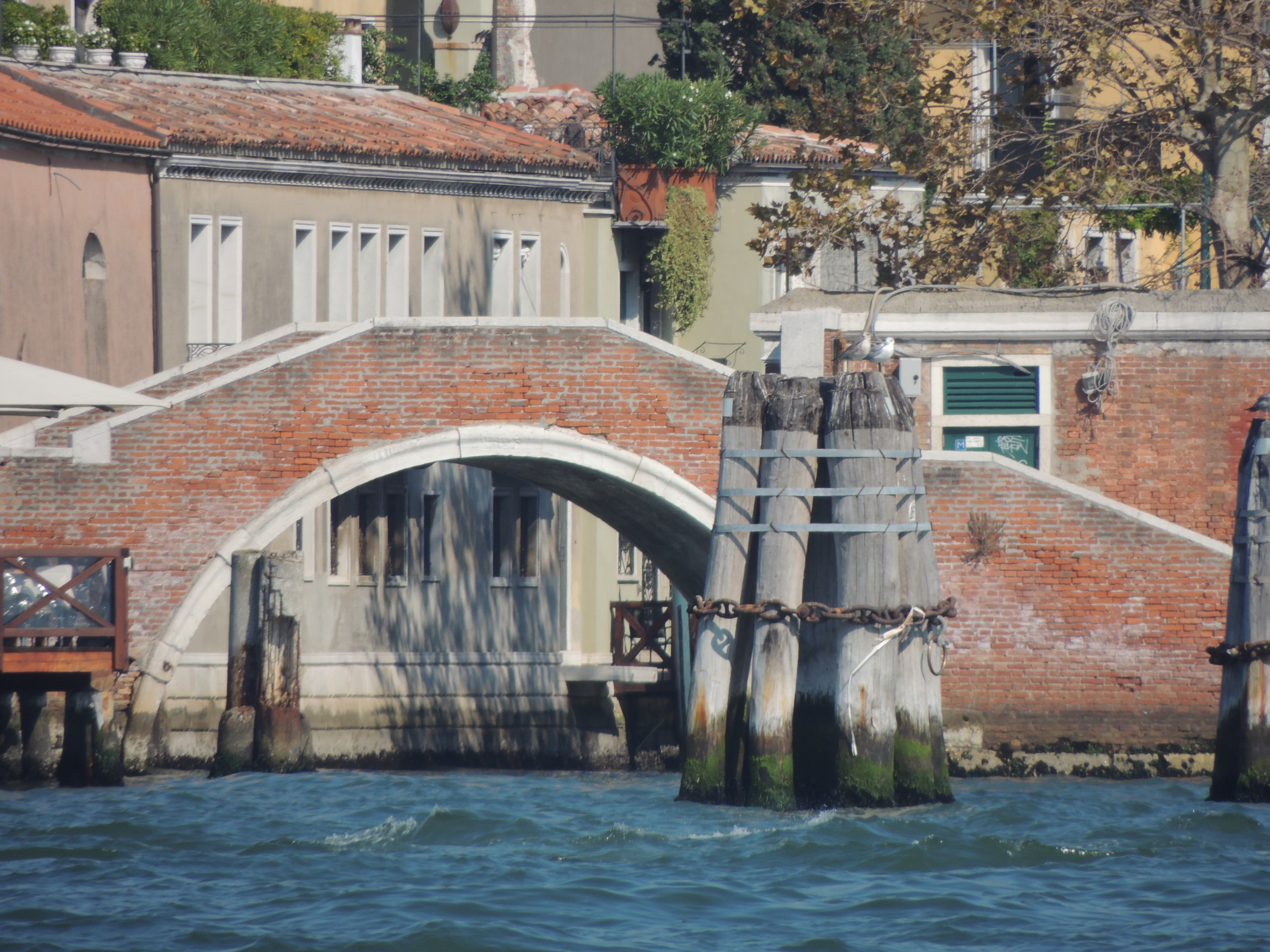
Ponte de l'Umiltà
Rio della Salute

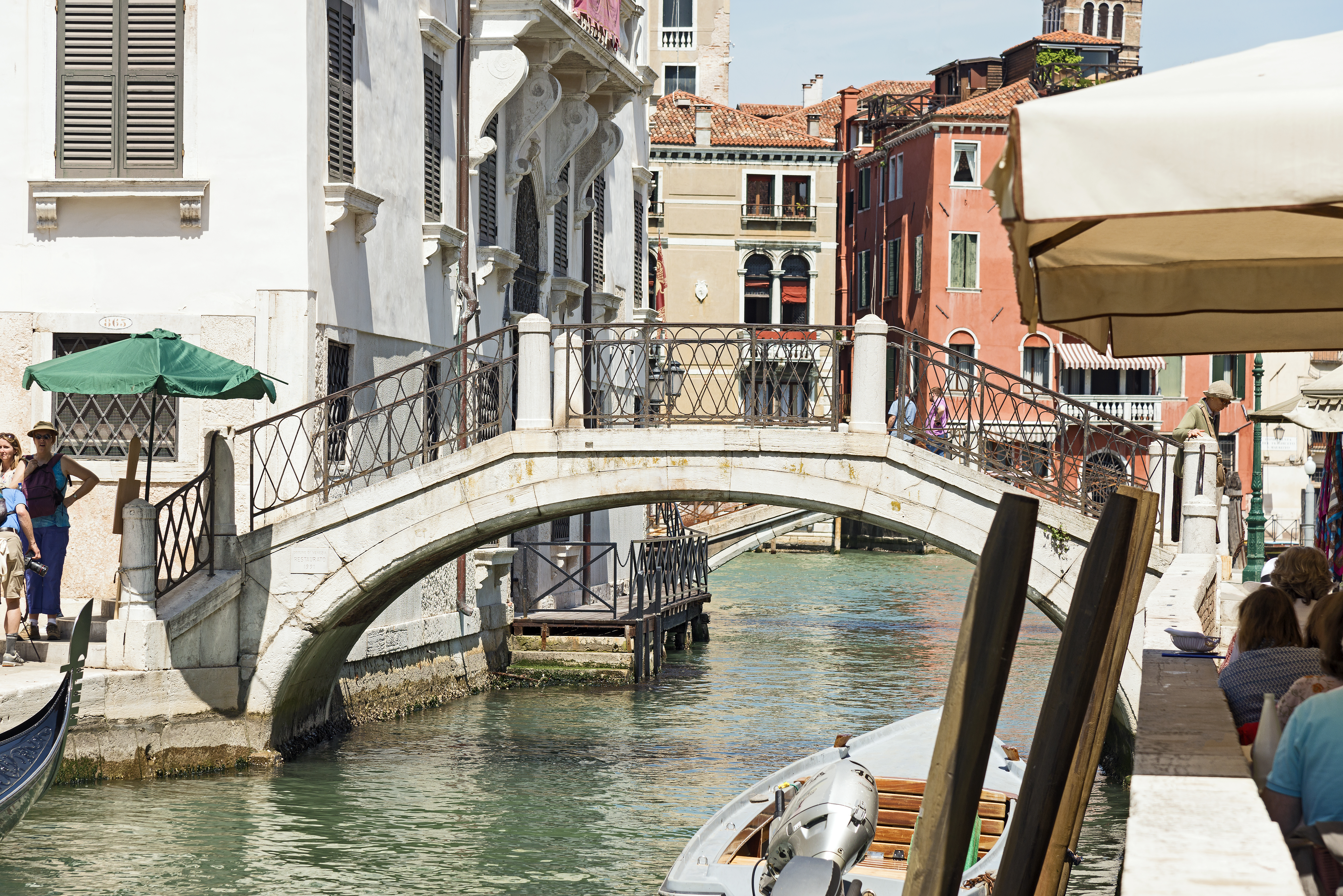
Ponte San Vio
Rio de San Vio
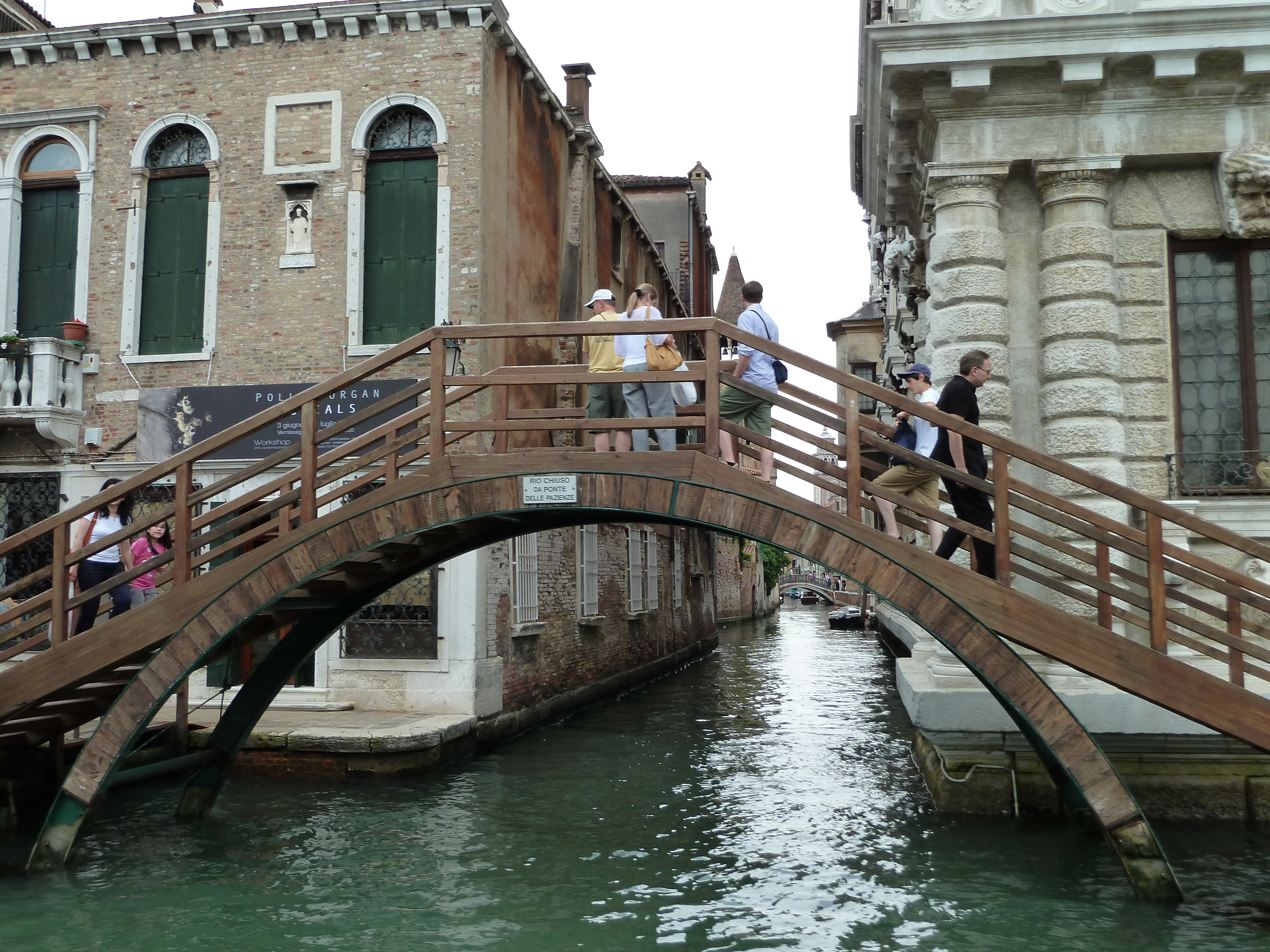
private bridge of the Ca' Rezzonico
Rio de San Barnaba

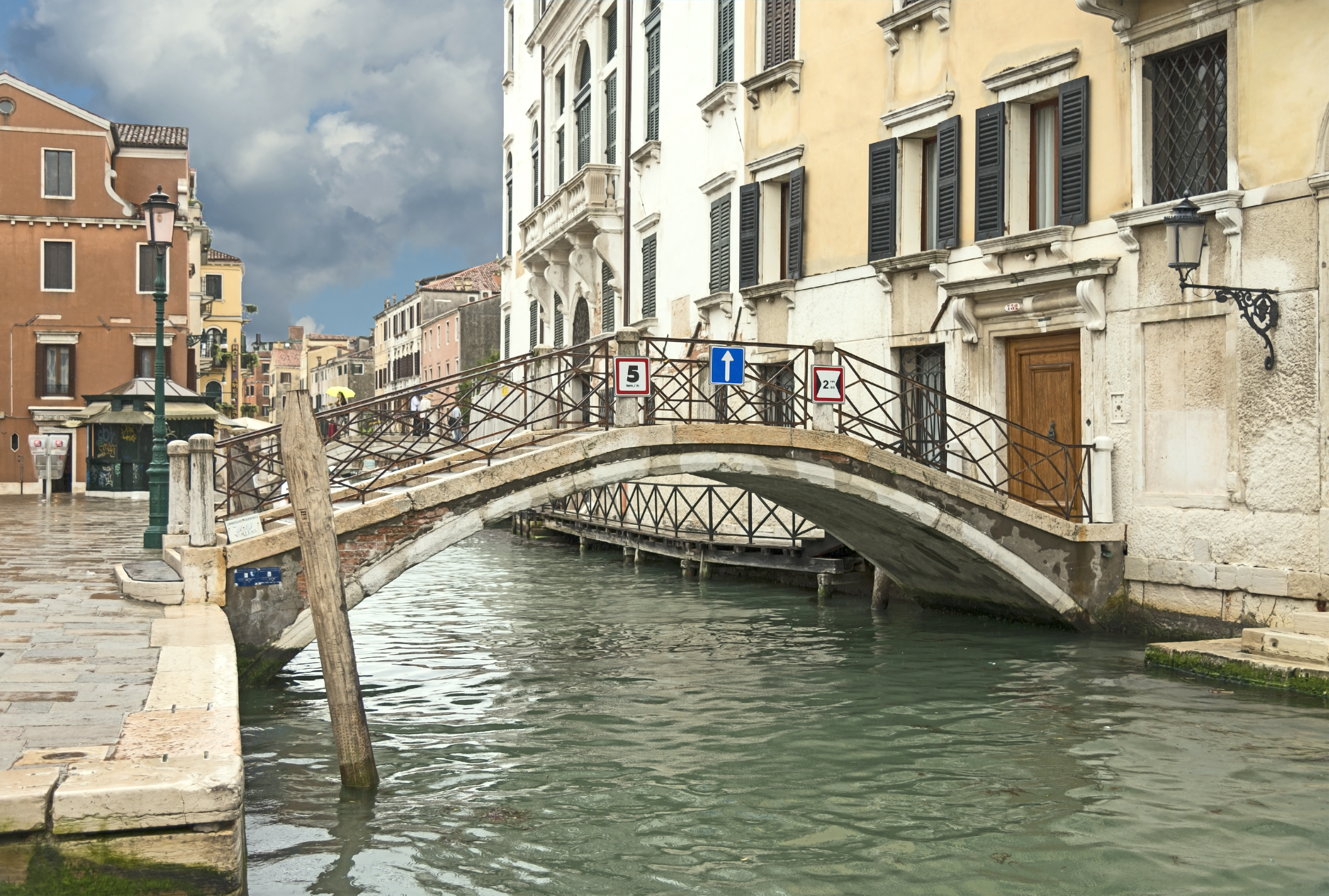
private bridge of the Palais Loredan Cini
Rio de San Vio

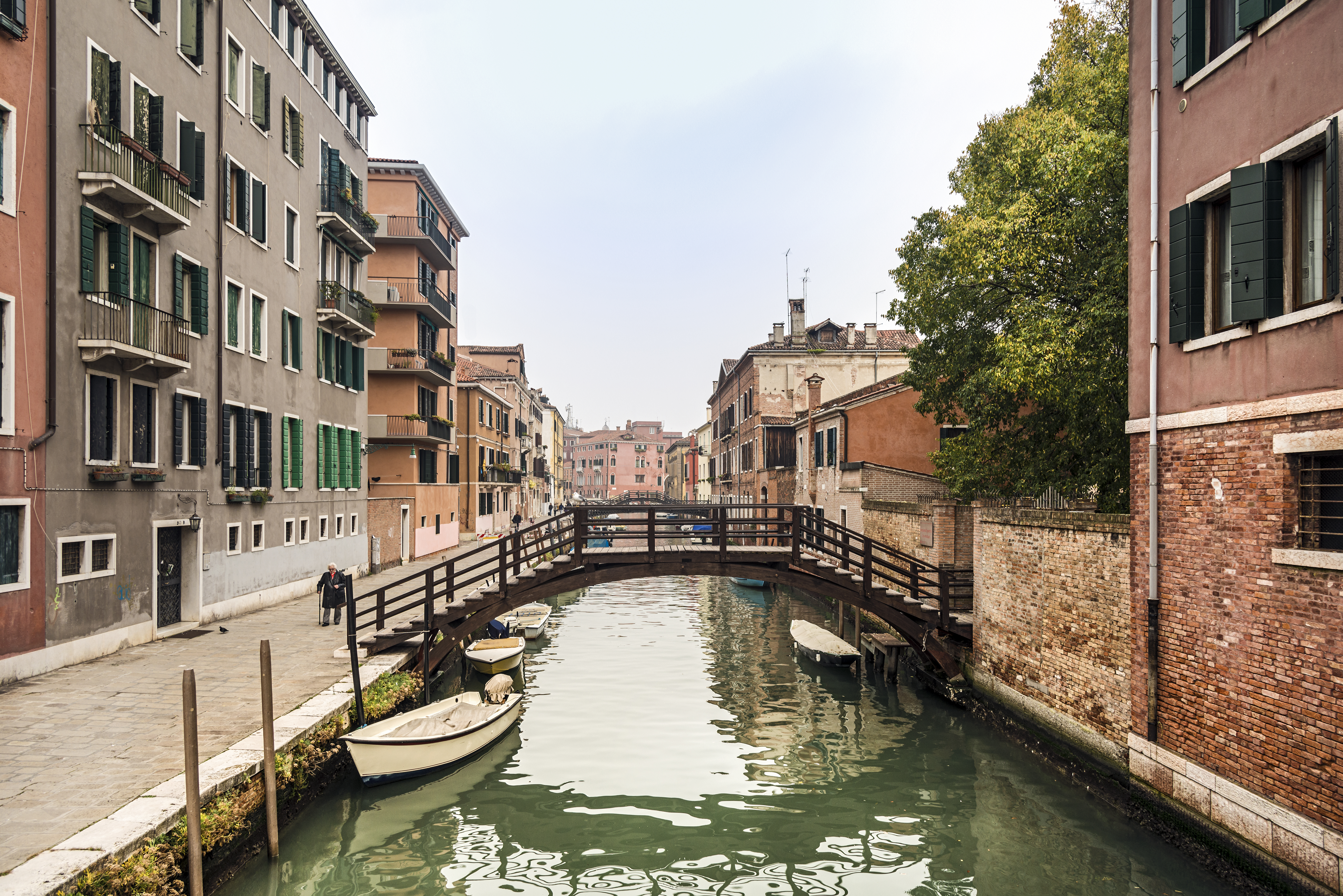
private bridge Ponte del Convitto Biancotto, Rio del Tentor

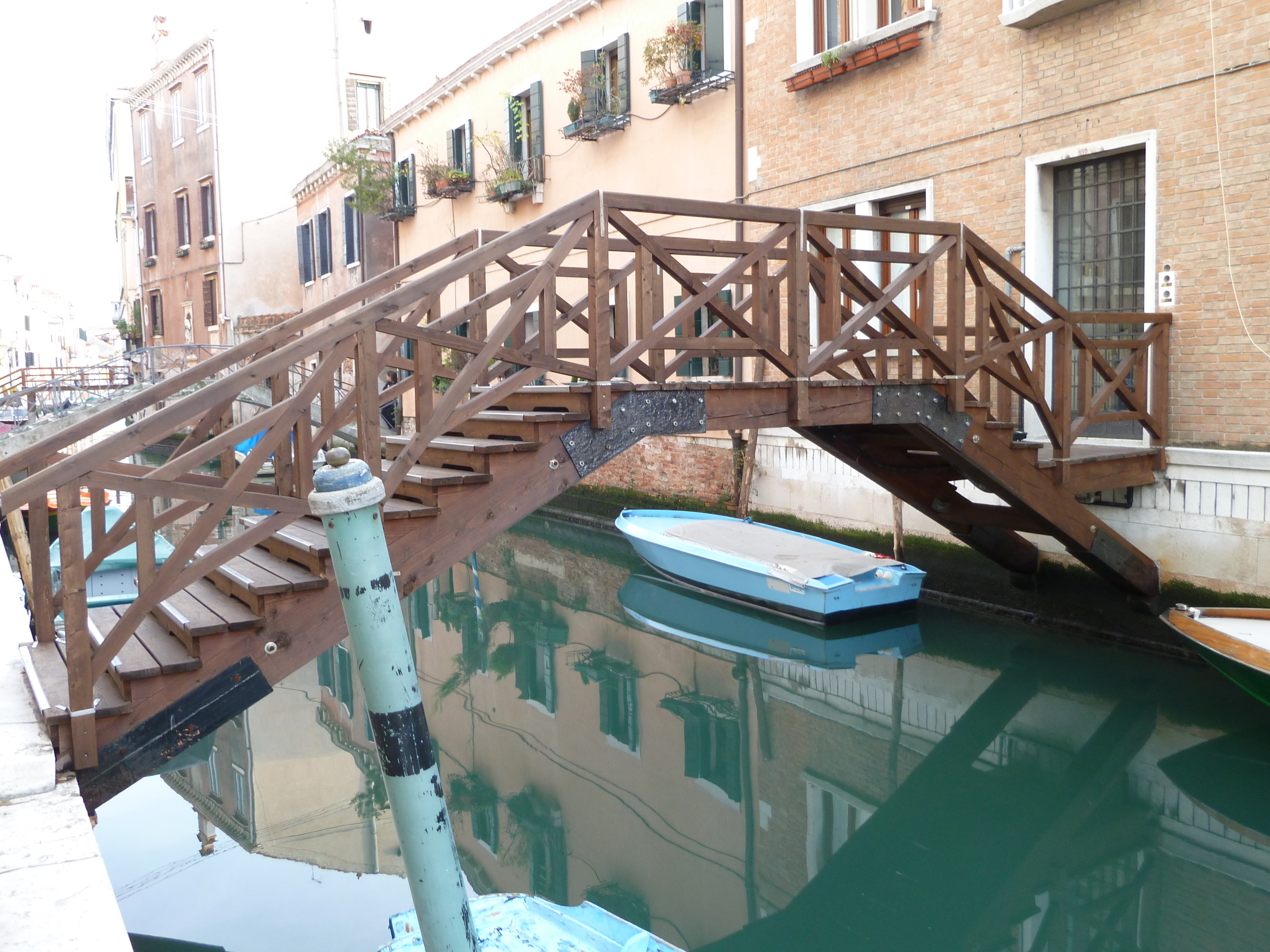
private bridge(No. 1462/A), Rio dei Ognissanti

=== Giudecca ===
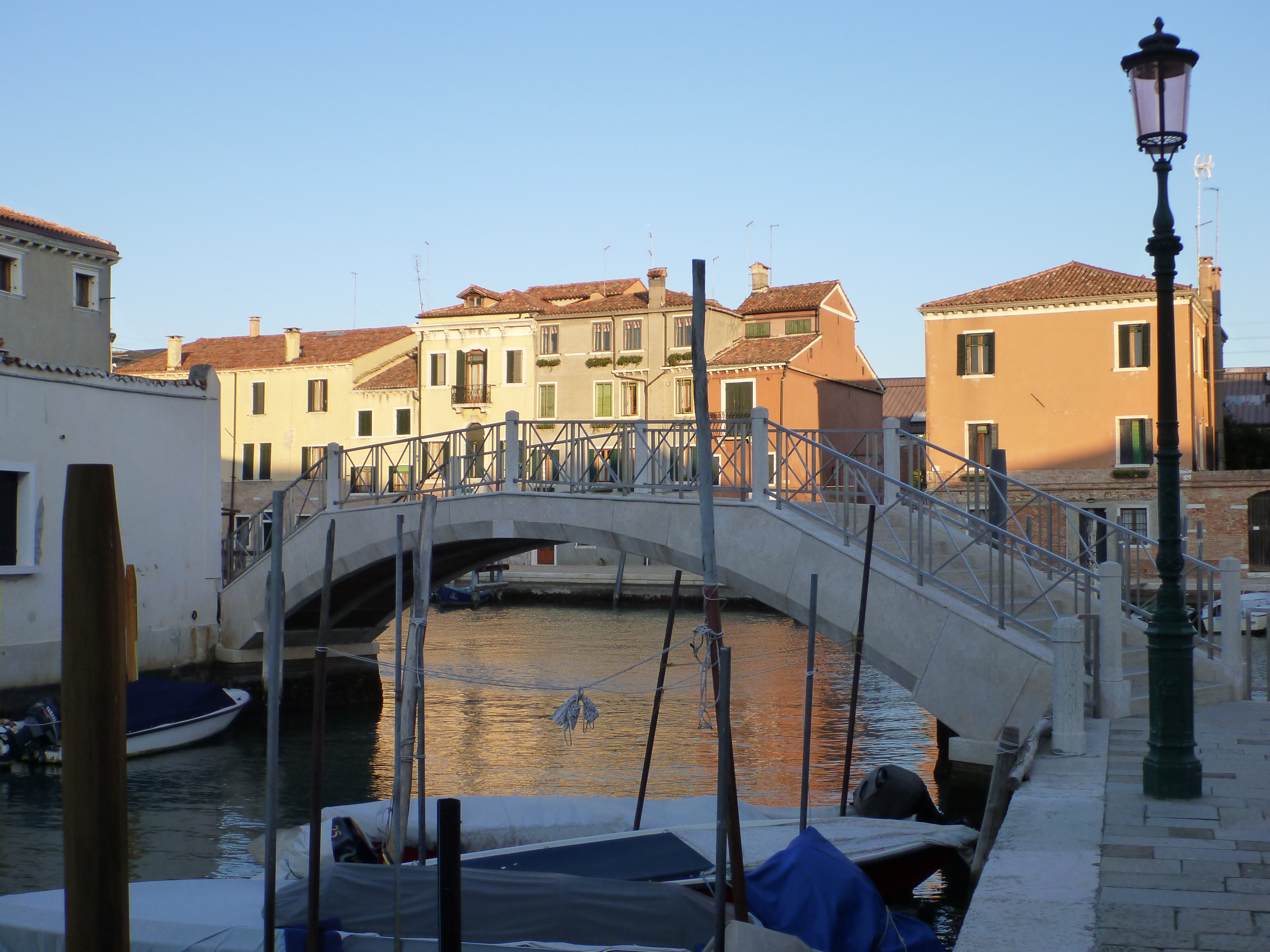
Ponte Sant'Angelo
Rio de la Palada

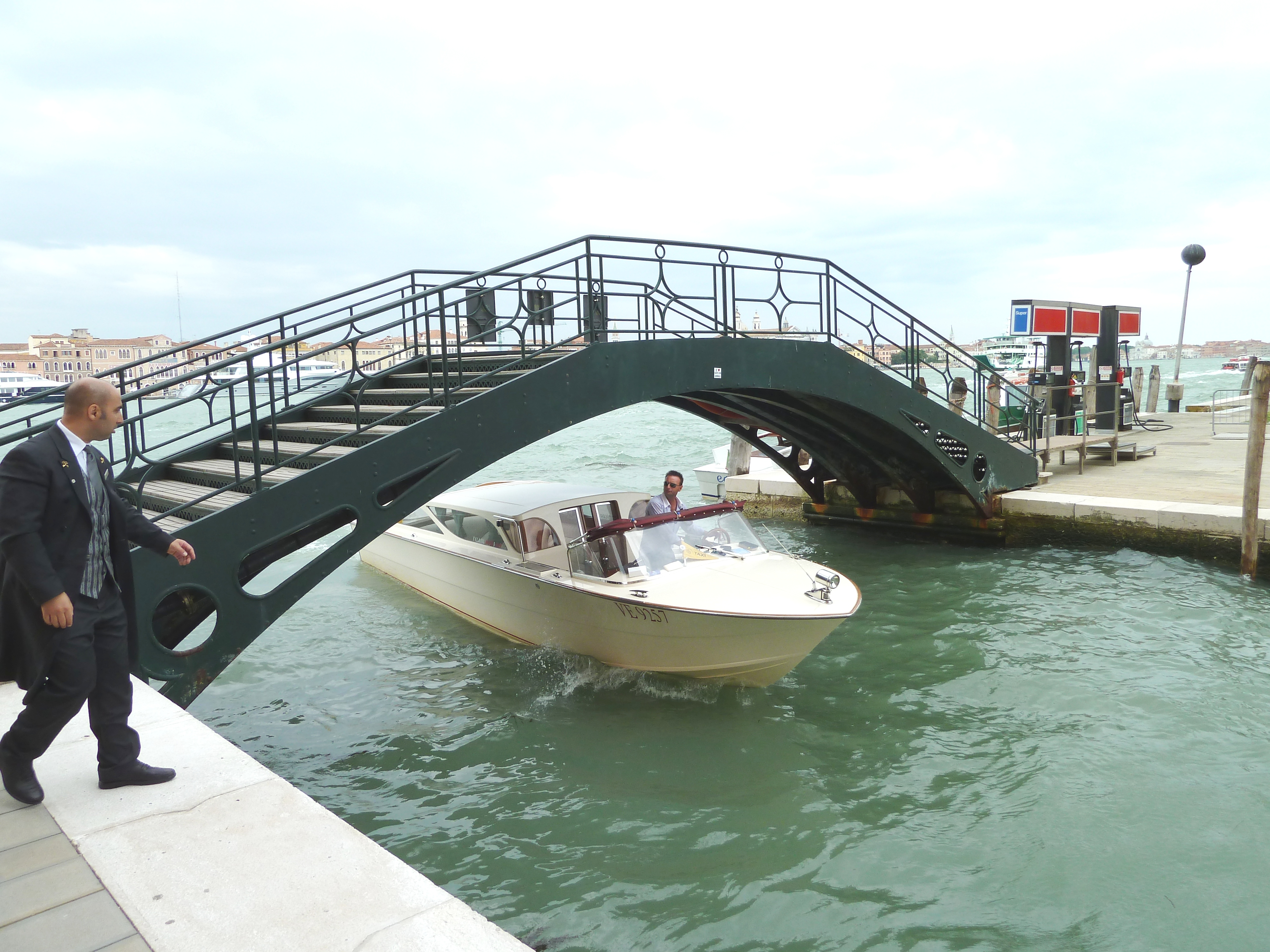
Ponte San Biagio
Rio de San Biagio

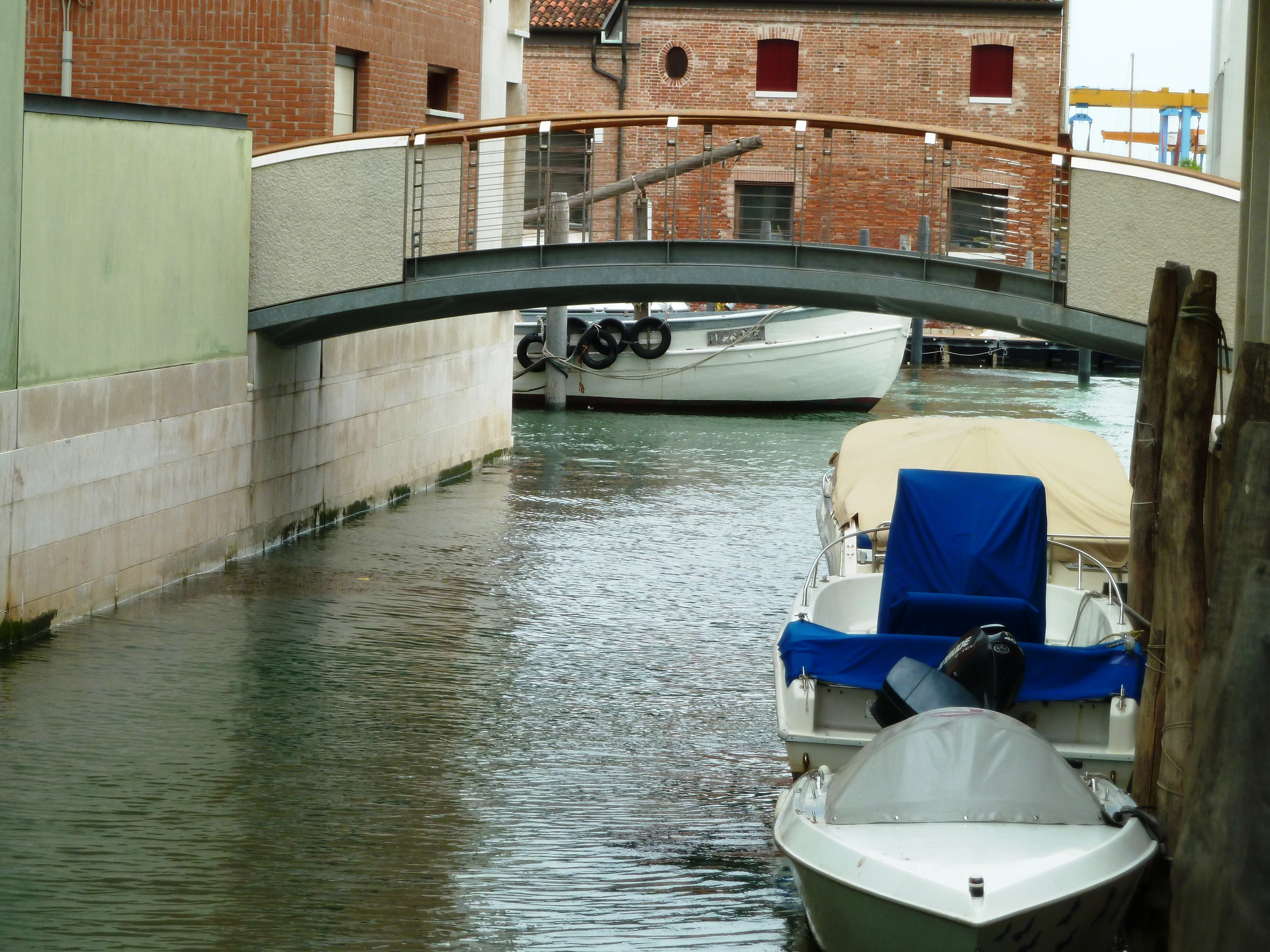
Ponte dei Bolzeri
Rio dei Scorzeri

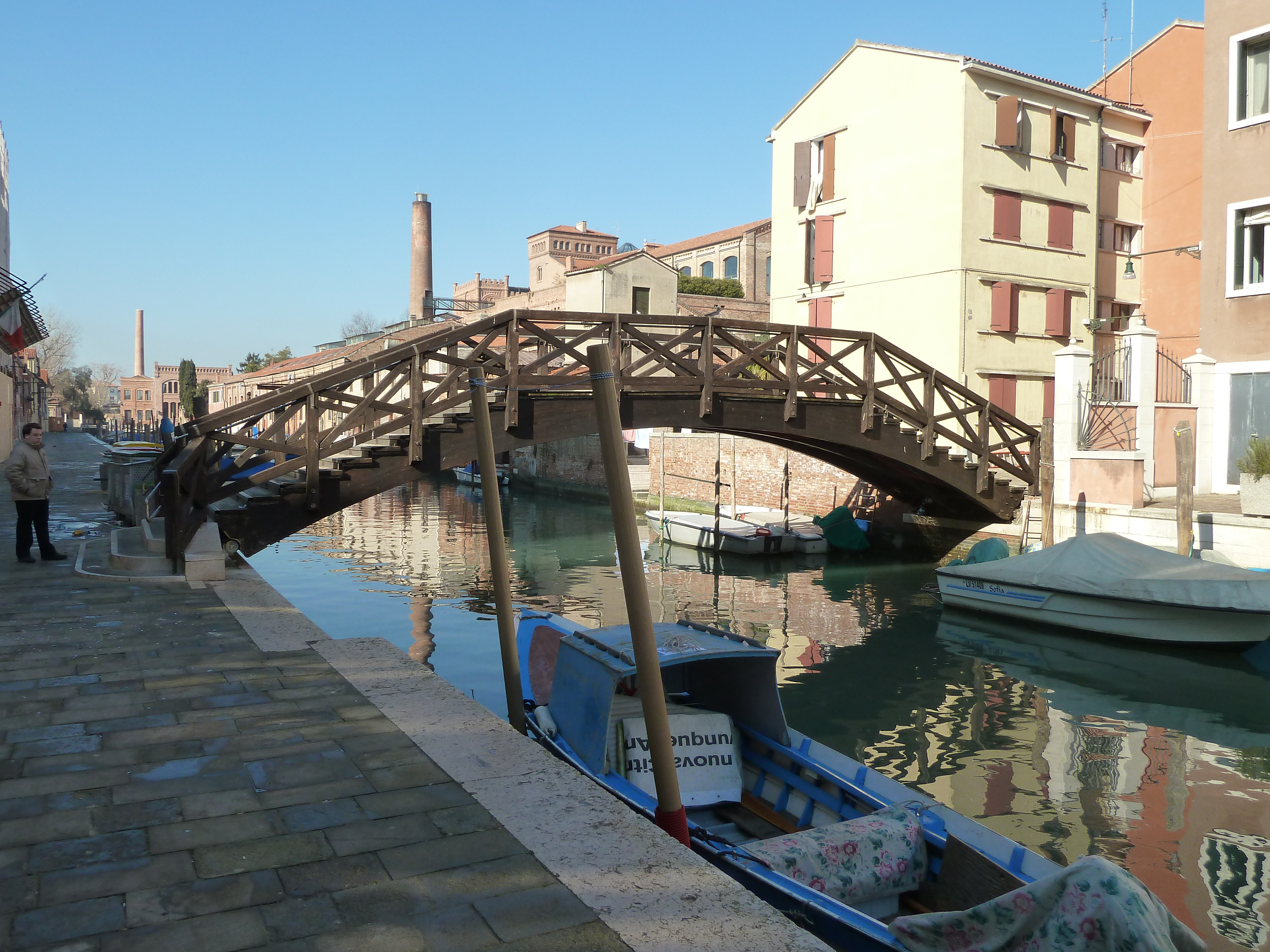
Ponte de le Convertite
Rio de le Convertite

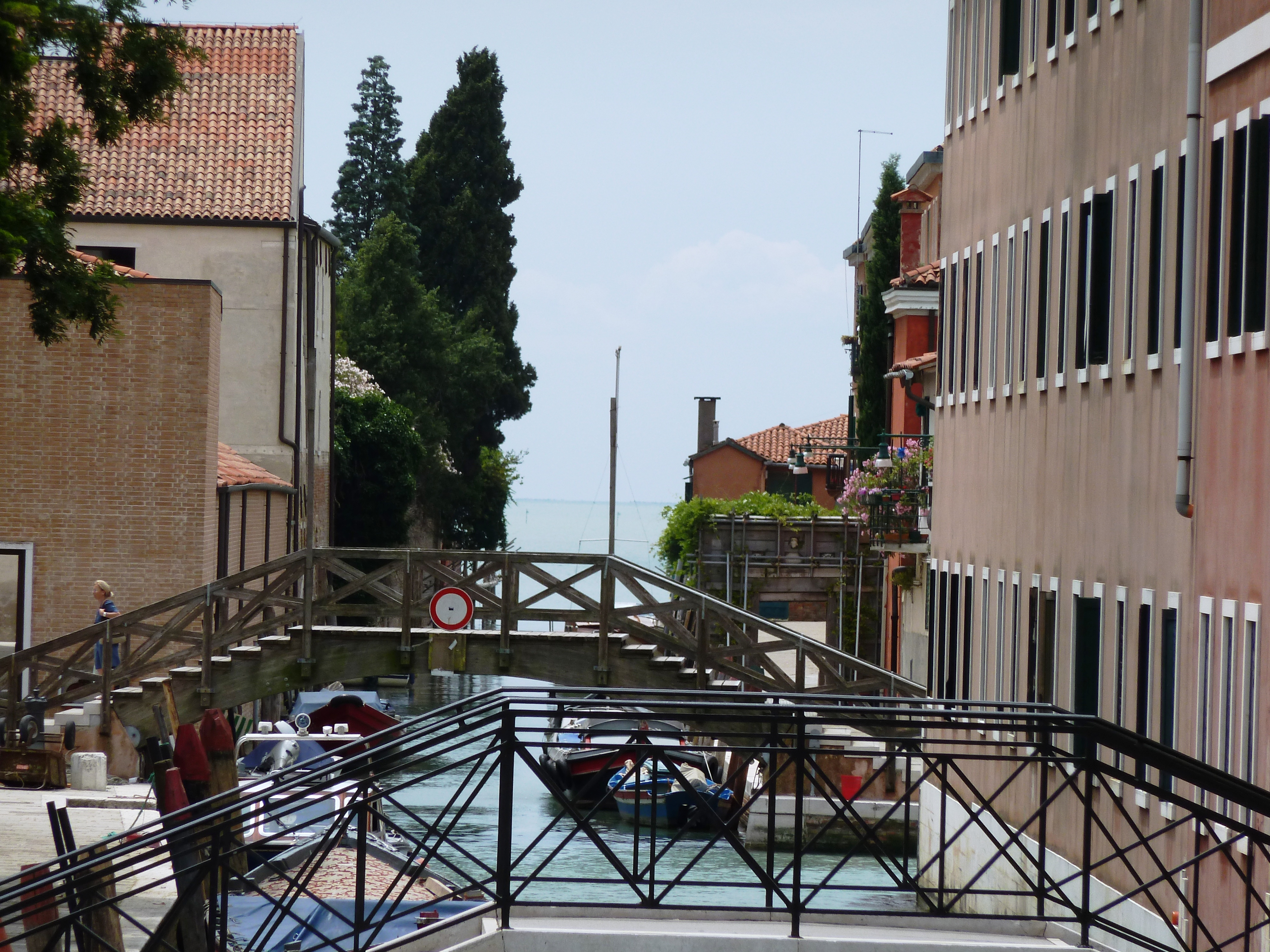
Ponte San Cosmo/Lagoscuro
Rio de Sant'Eufemia

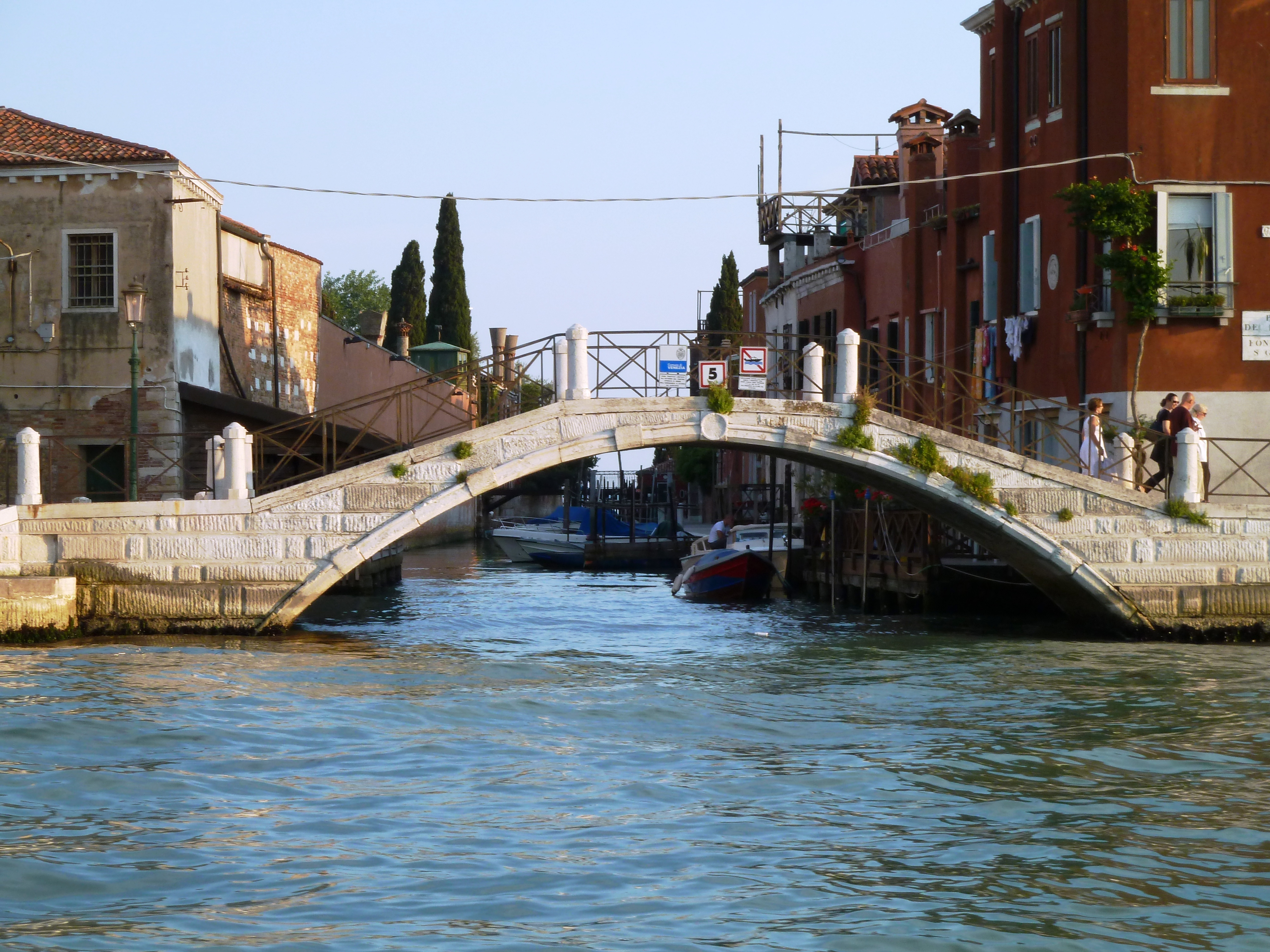
Ponte de la Croze
Rio de la Croze

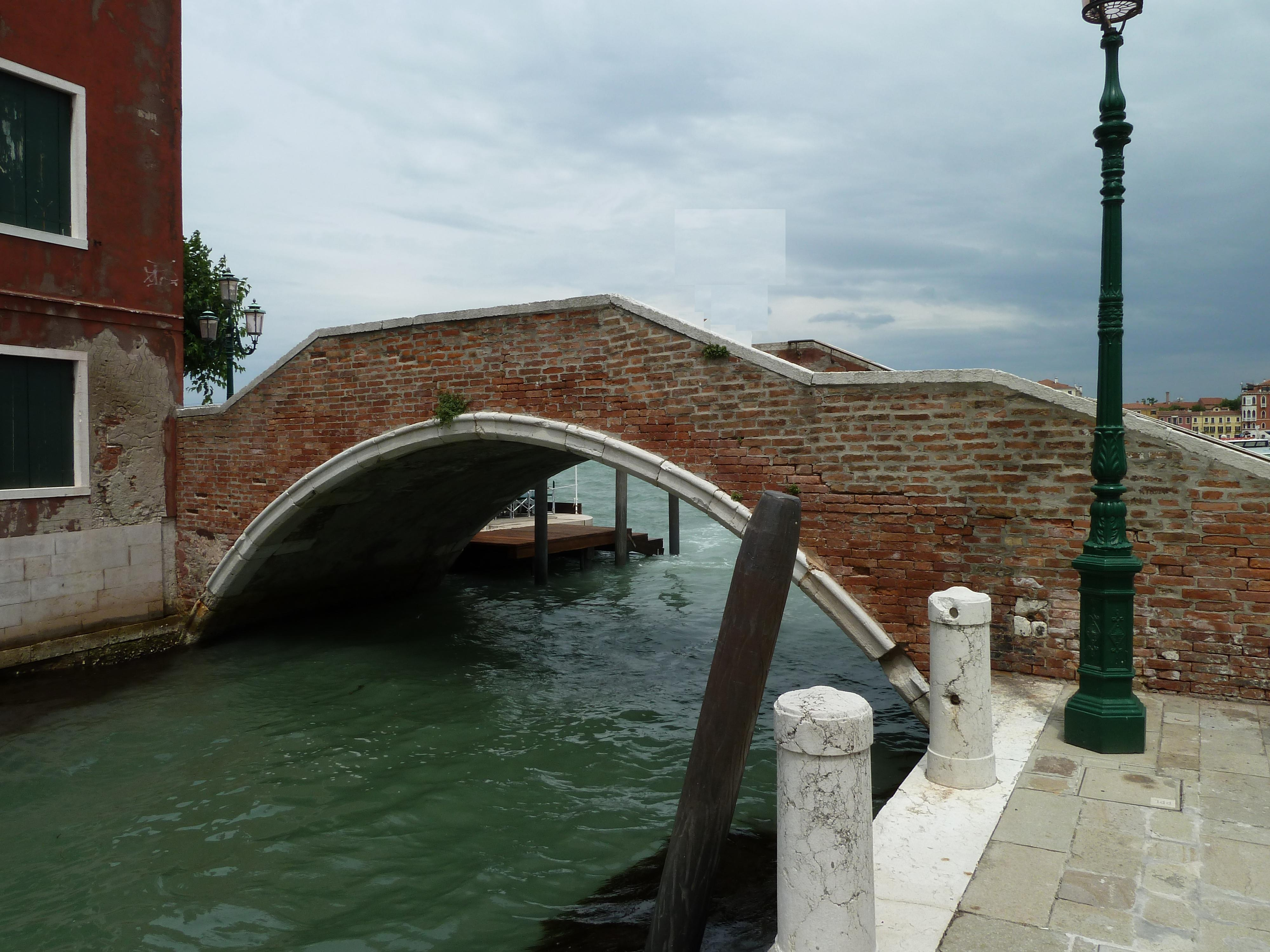
Ponte Sant'Eufemia
Rio de Sant'Eufemia

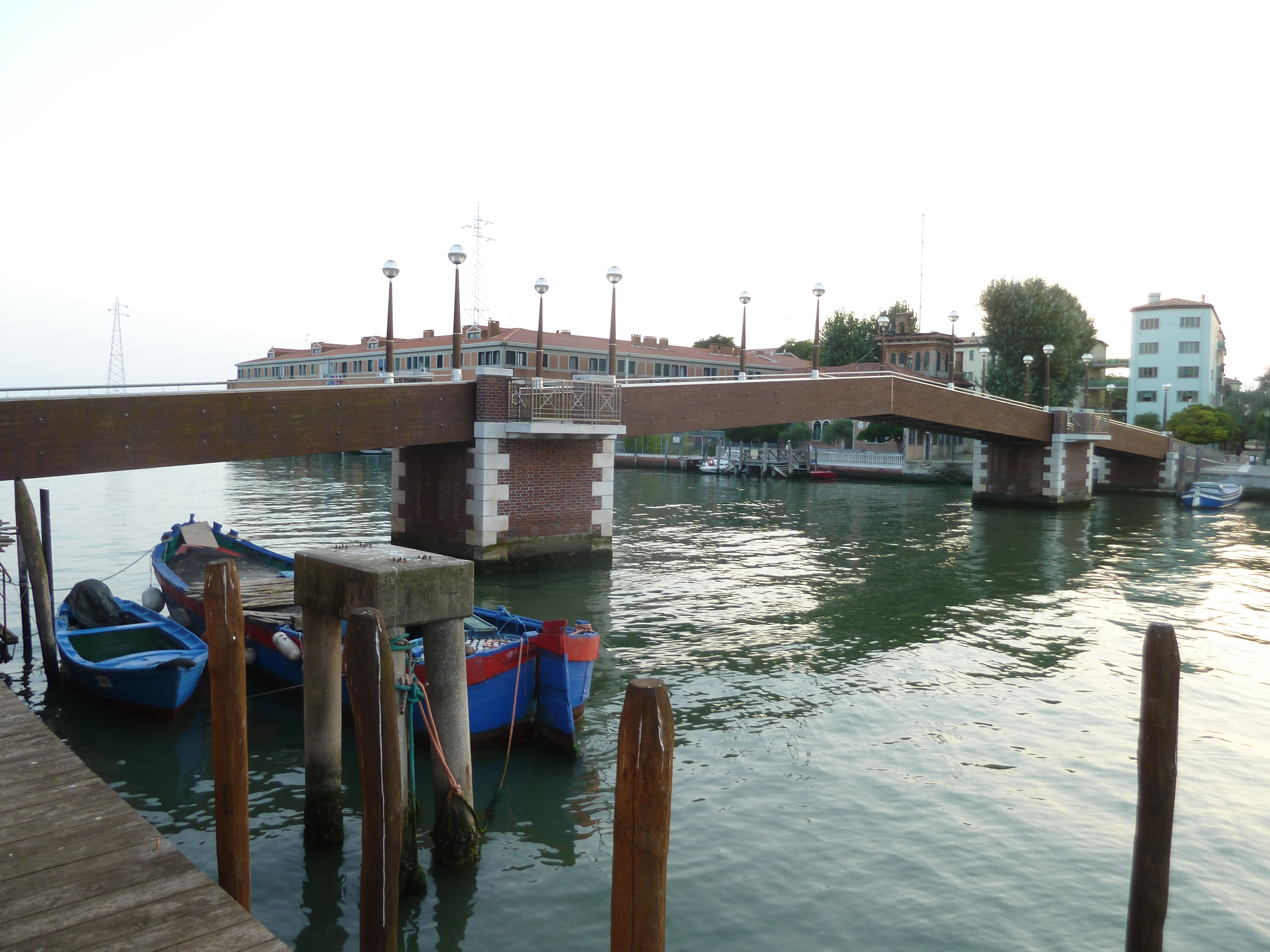
Ponte dei Lavraneri Canale dei Lavraneri

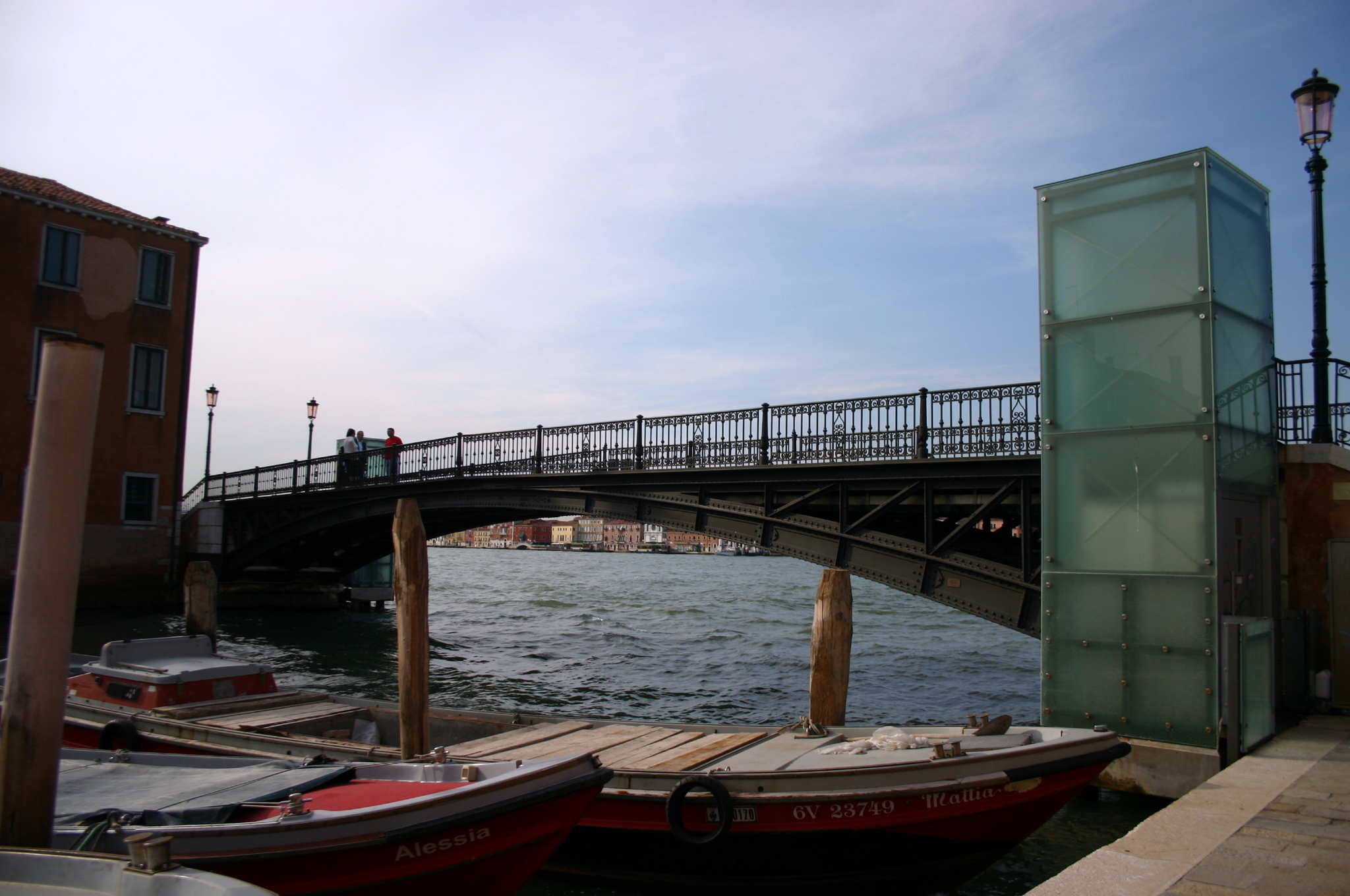
Ponte Longo
Rio Ponte Longo

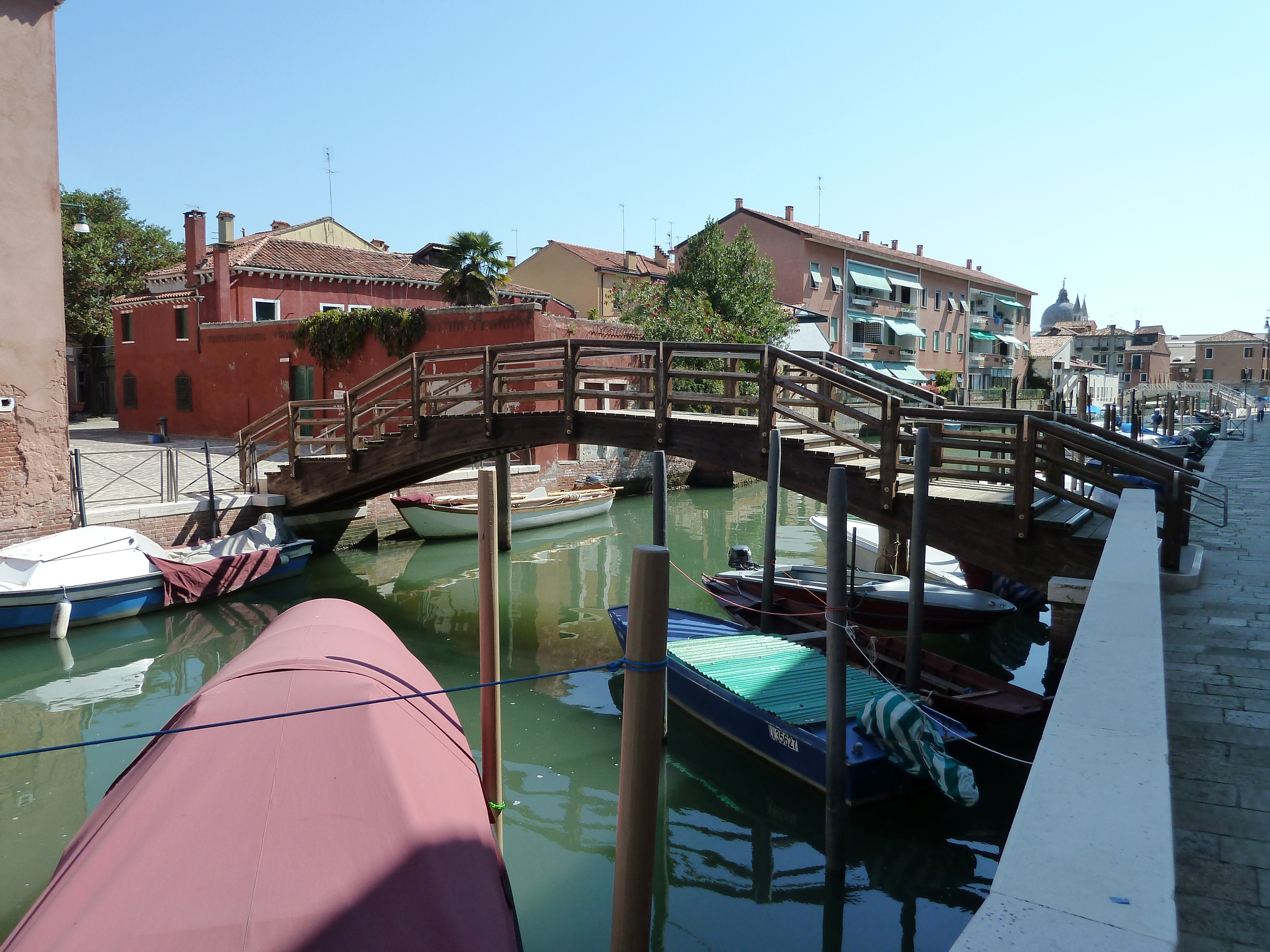
Ponte de la Palada
Rio de la Palada

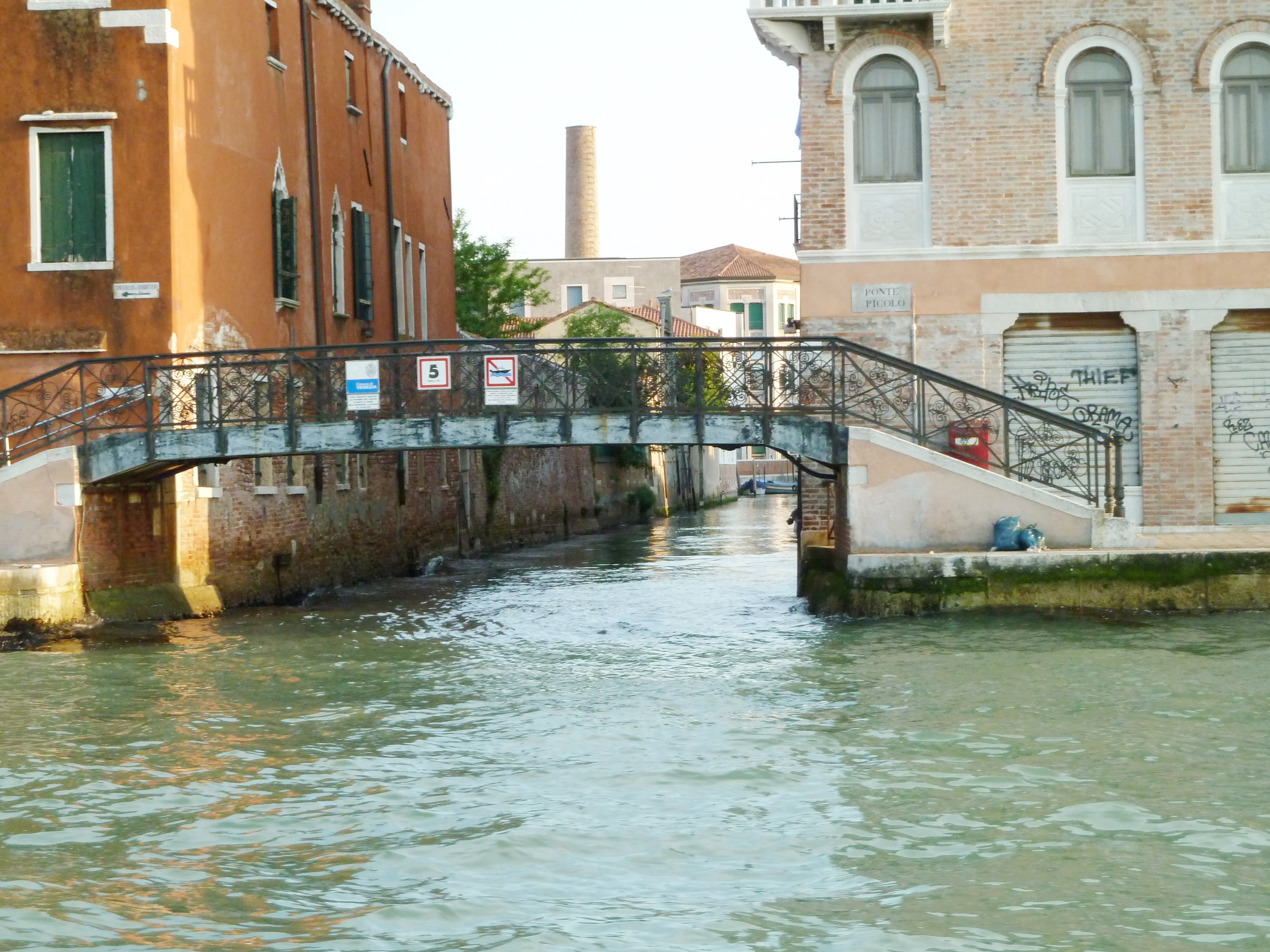
Ponte Piccolo
Rio del Ponte Piccolo

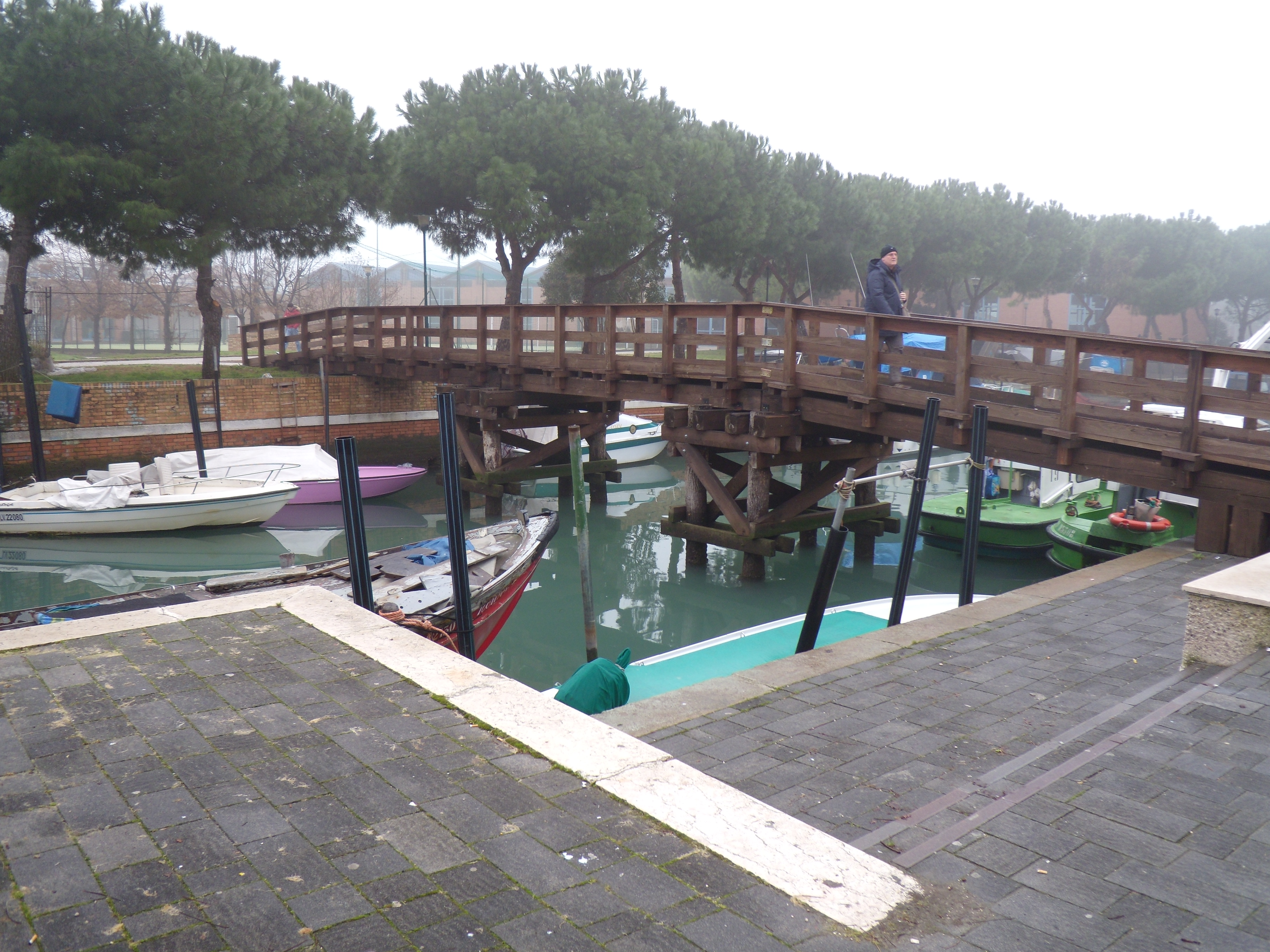
Ponte de la Piscina
Sacca Fisola

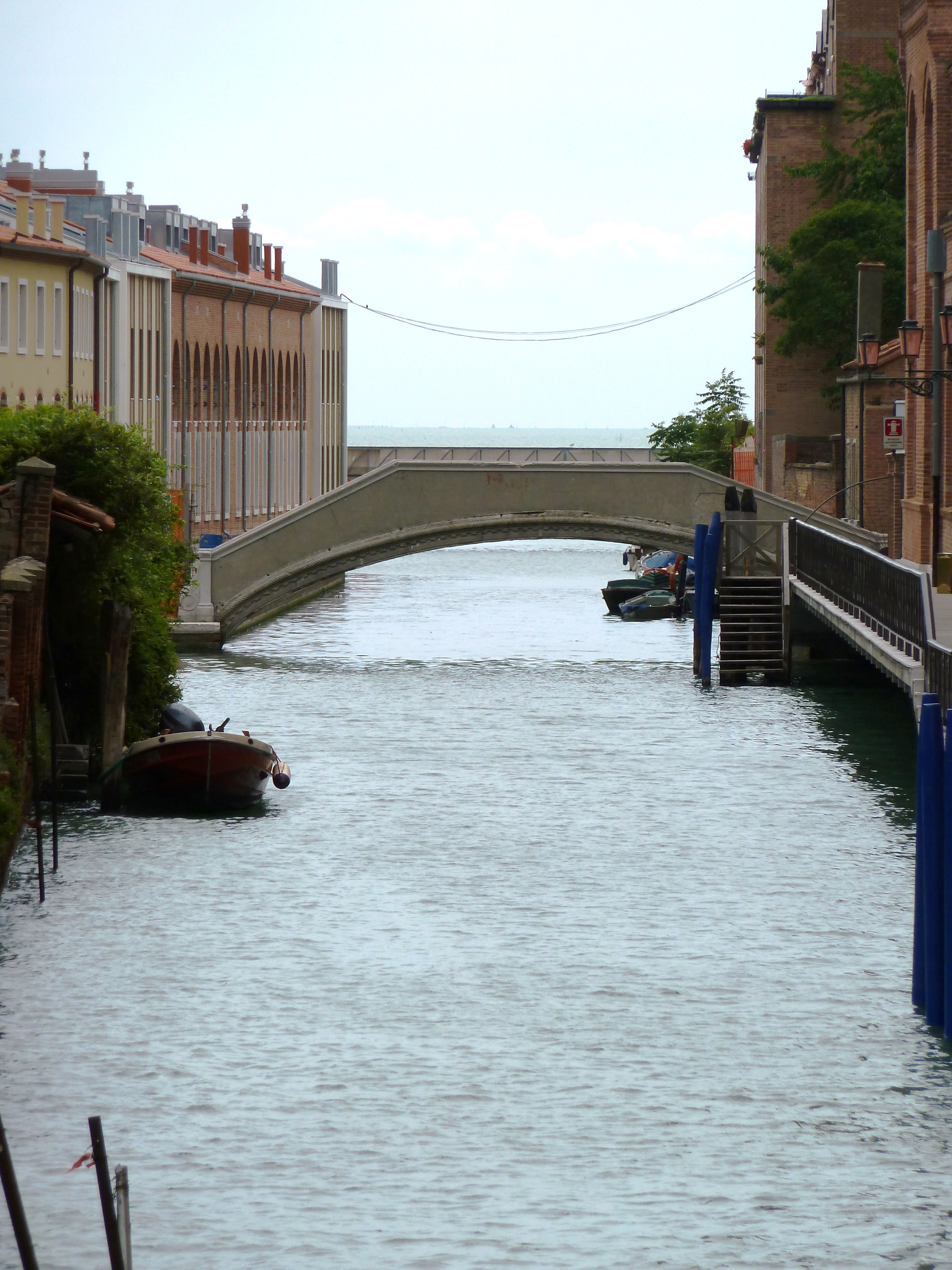
Ponte Priuli
Rio de San Biagio

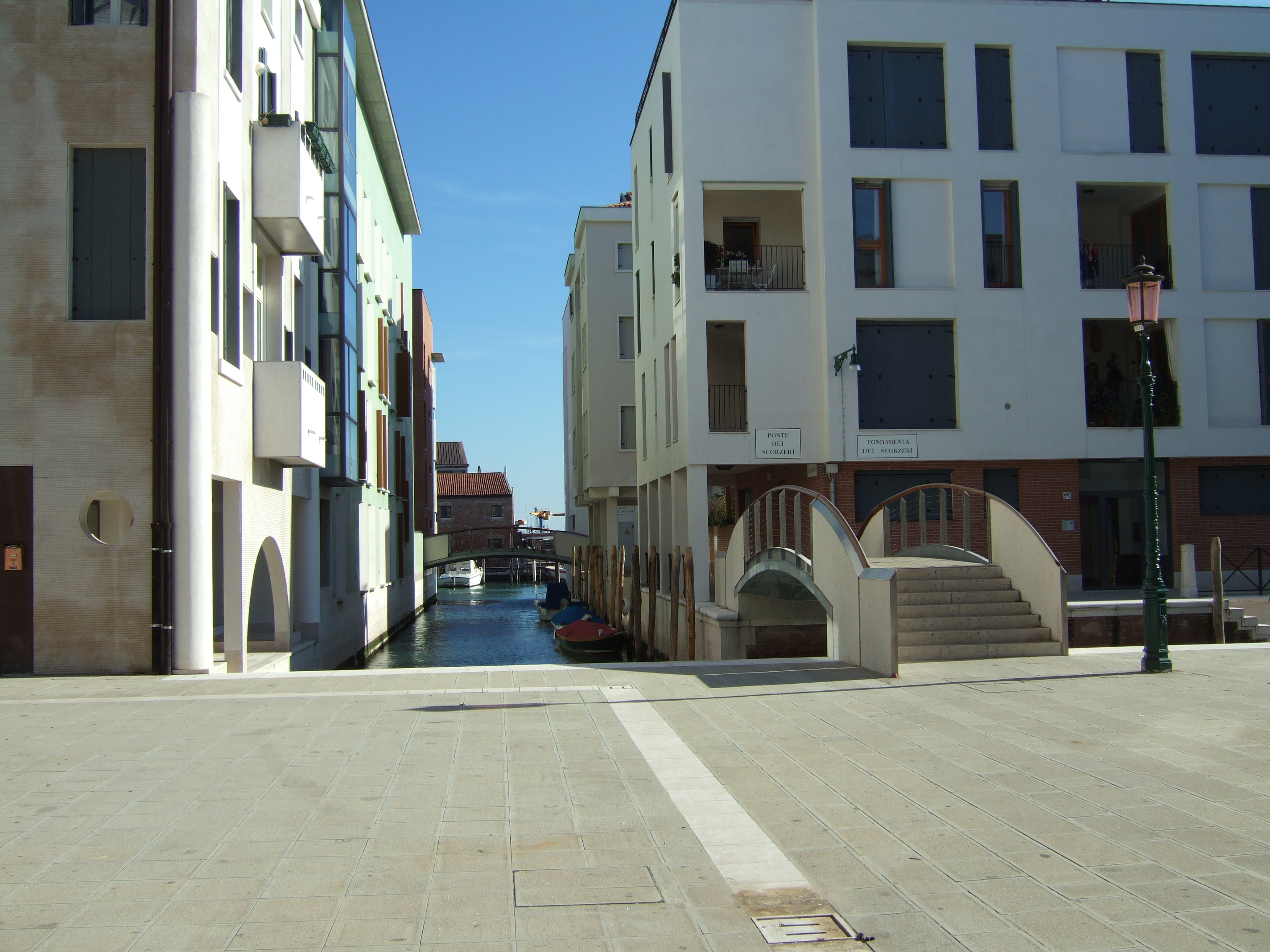
Ponte dei Scorzeri
Rio dei Scorzeri

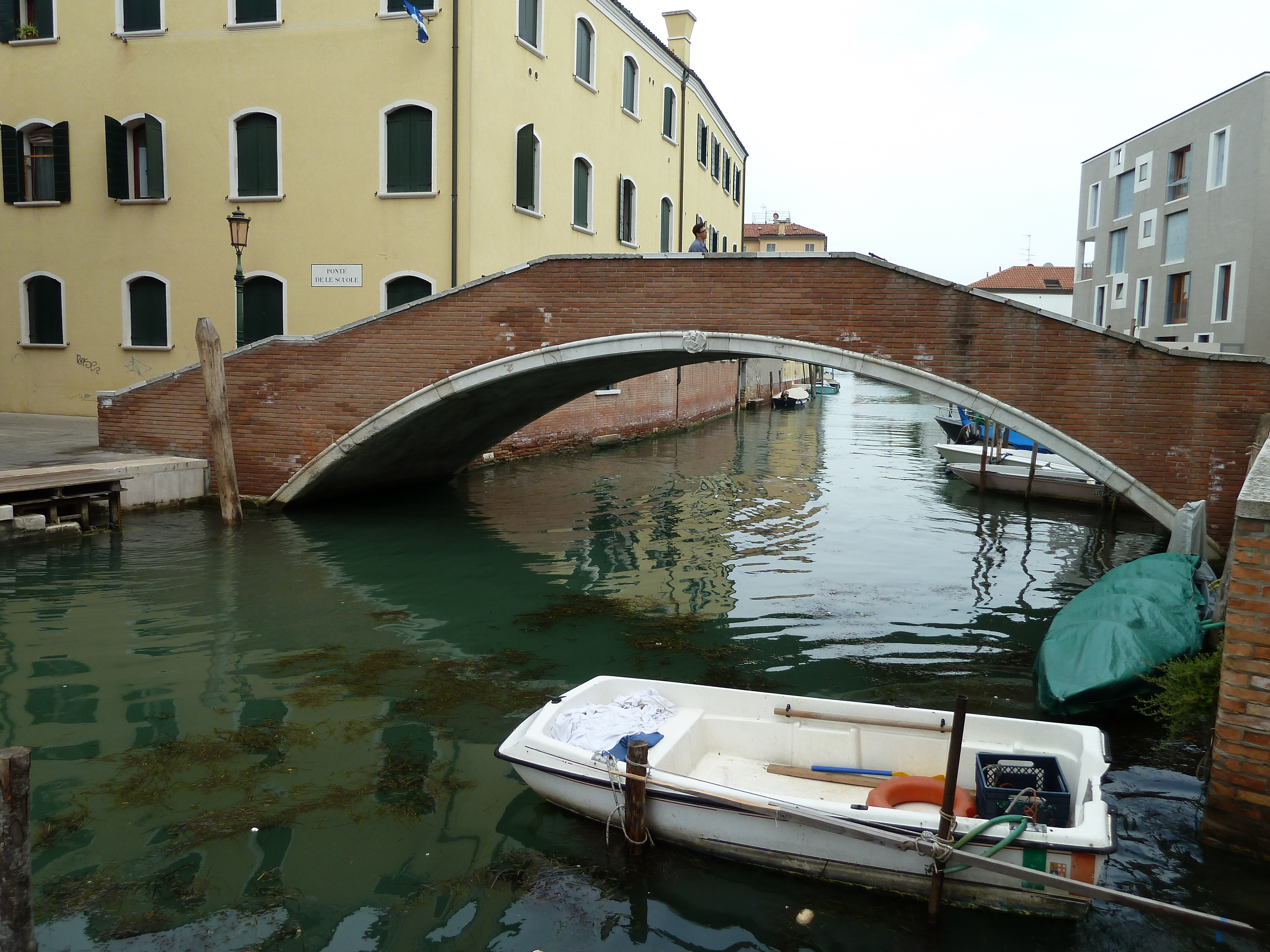
Ponte de le Scuole
Rio del ponte Piccolo

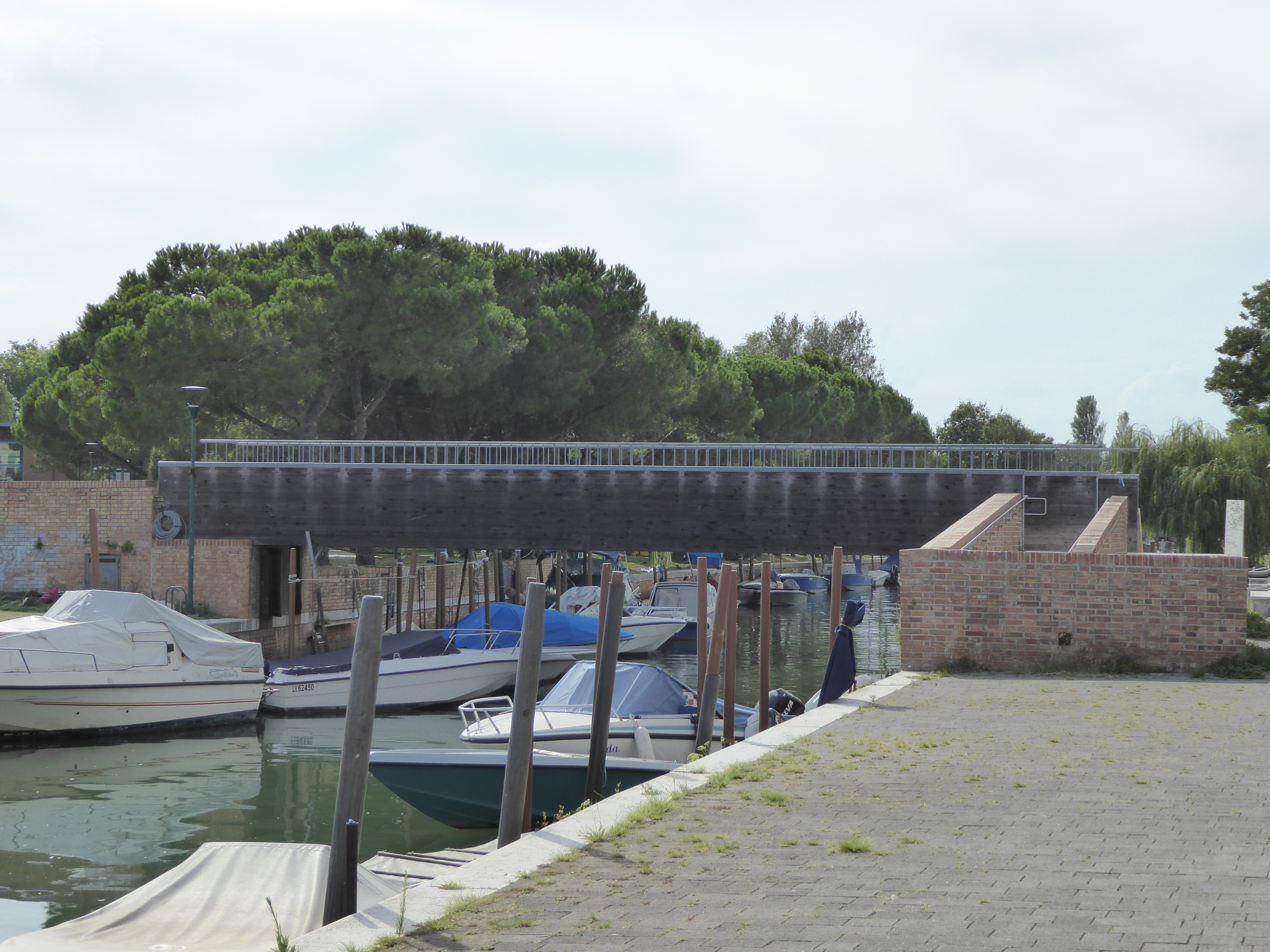
Ponte San Gerardo
Rio de Sacca Fisola

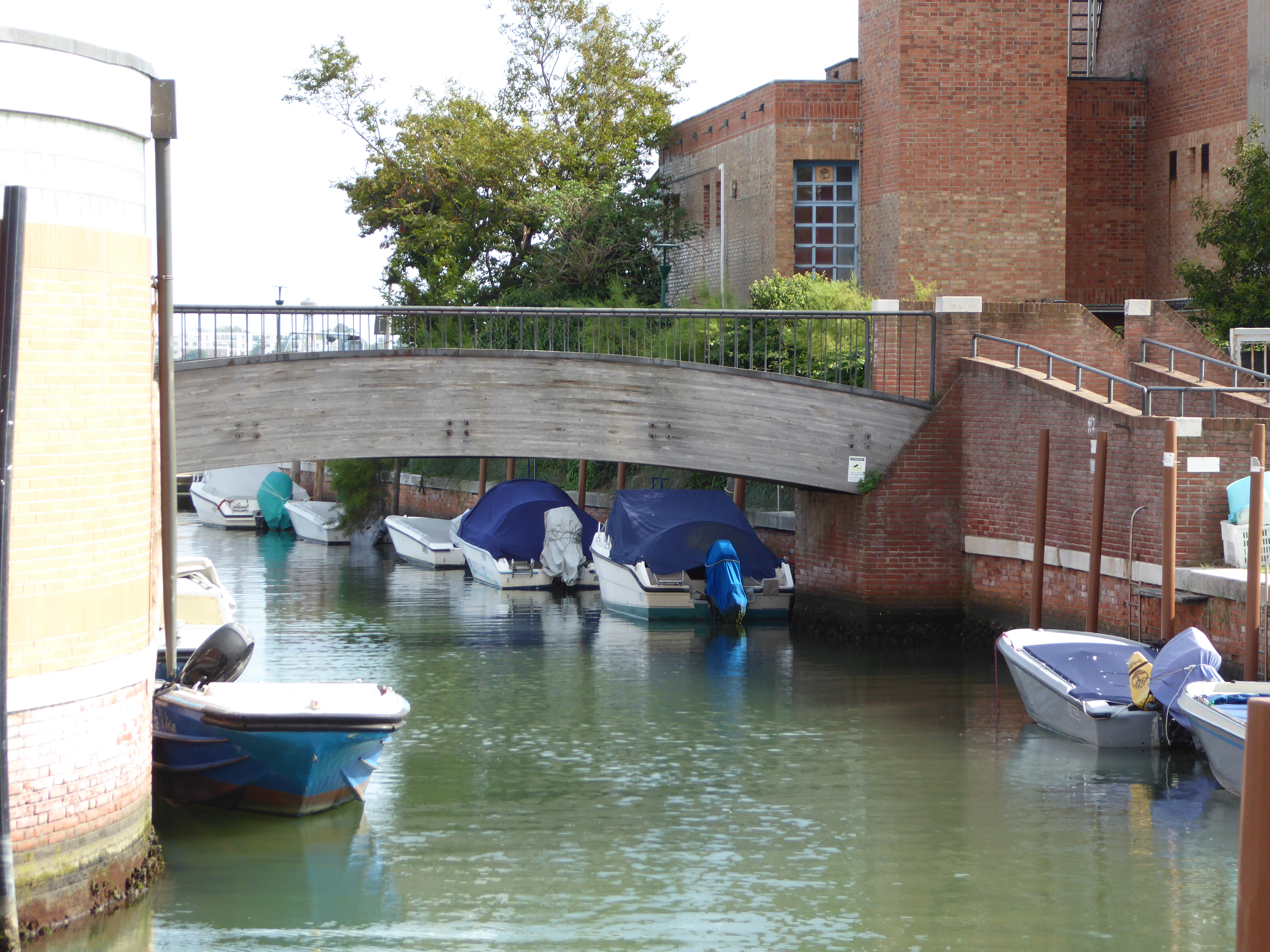
Ponte de le Remiere
Ramo 2° de rio de Sacca Fisola
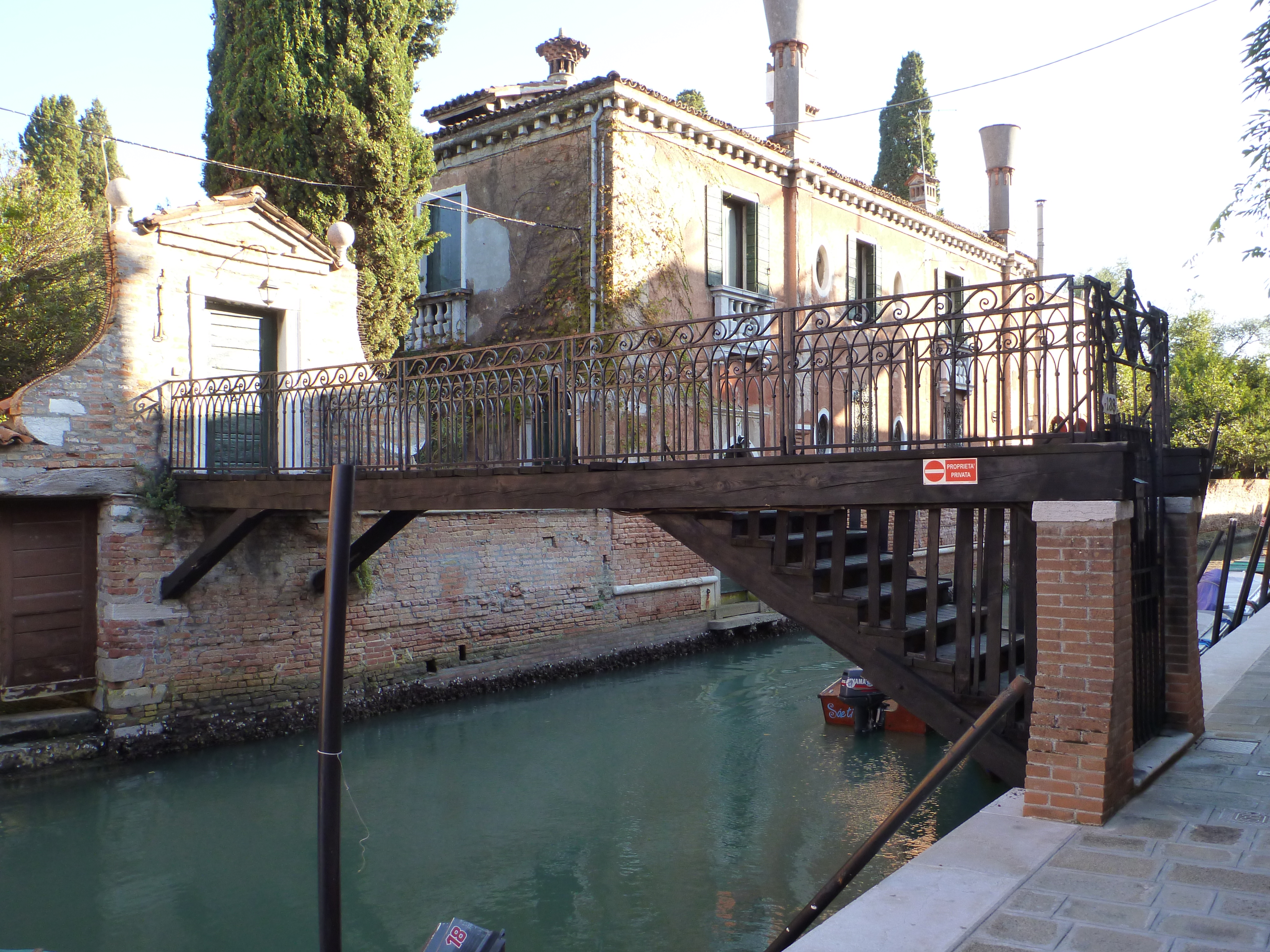
private bridge of the Jardins d'Eden
rio de la Croce

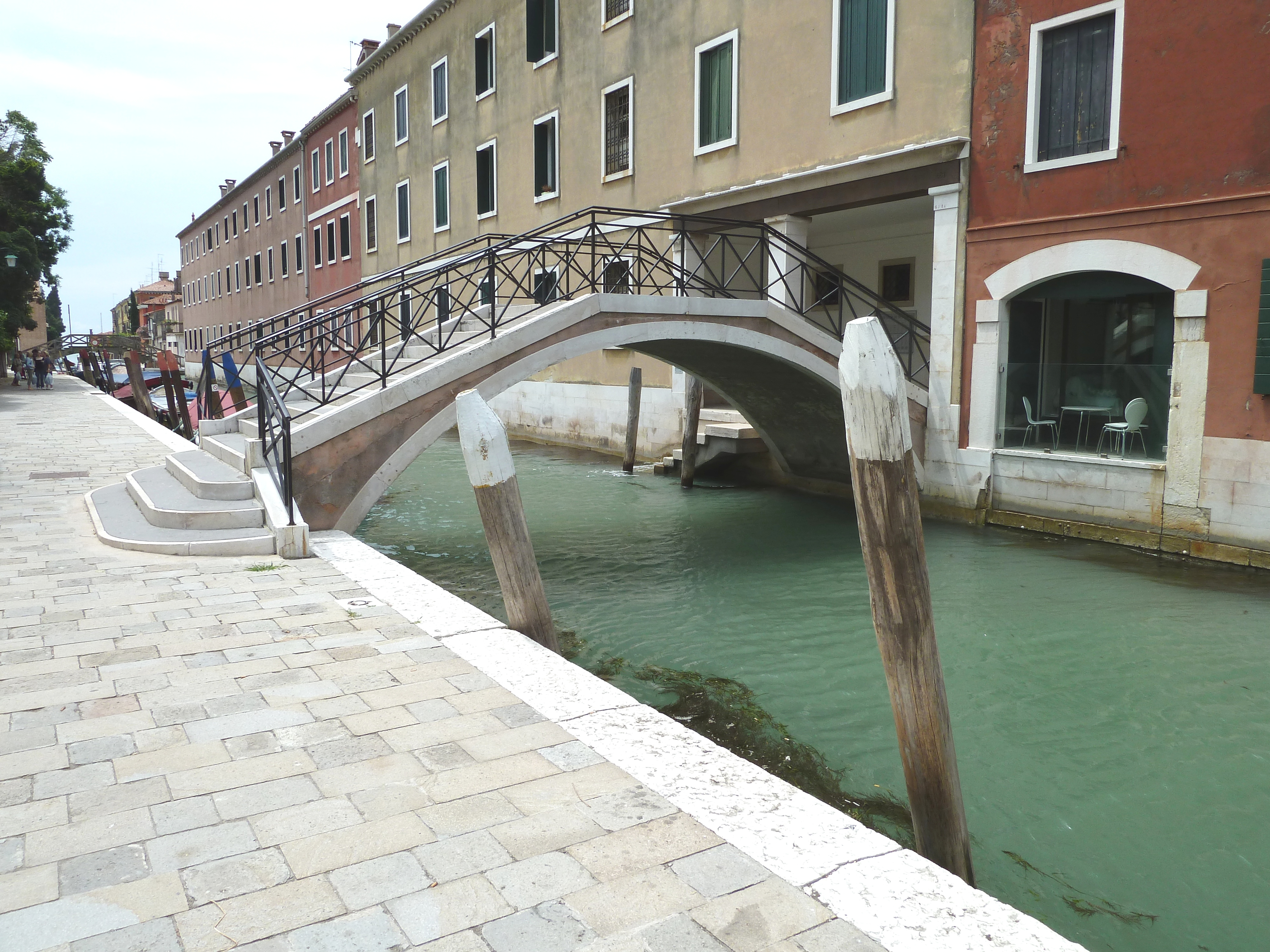
private bridge Rio de Sant'Eufemia

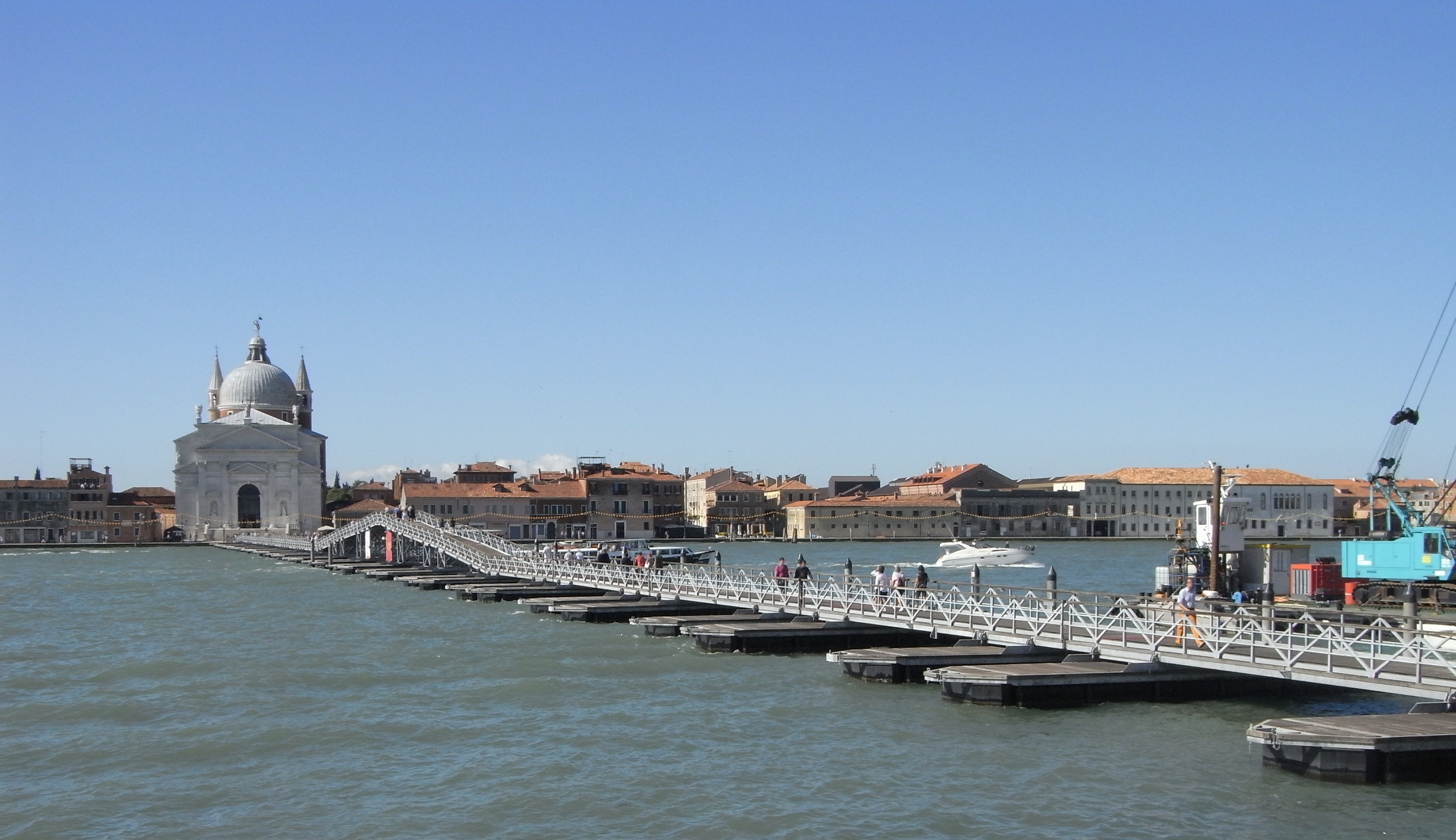
Annual ephemeral bridge for the Festa del Redentore
Canal de la Giudecca

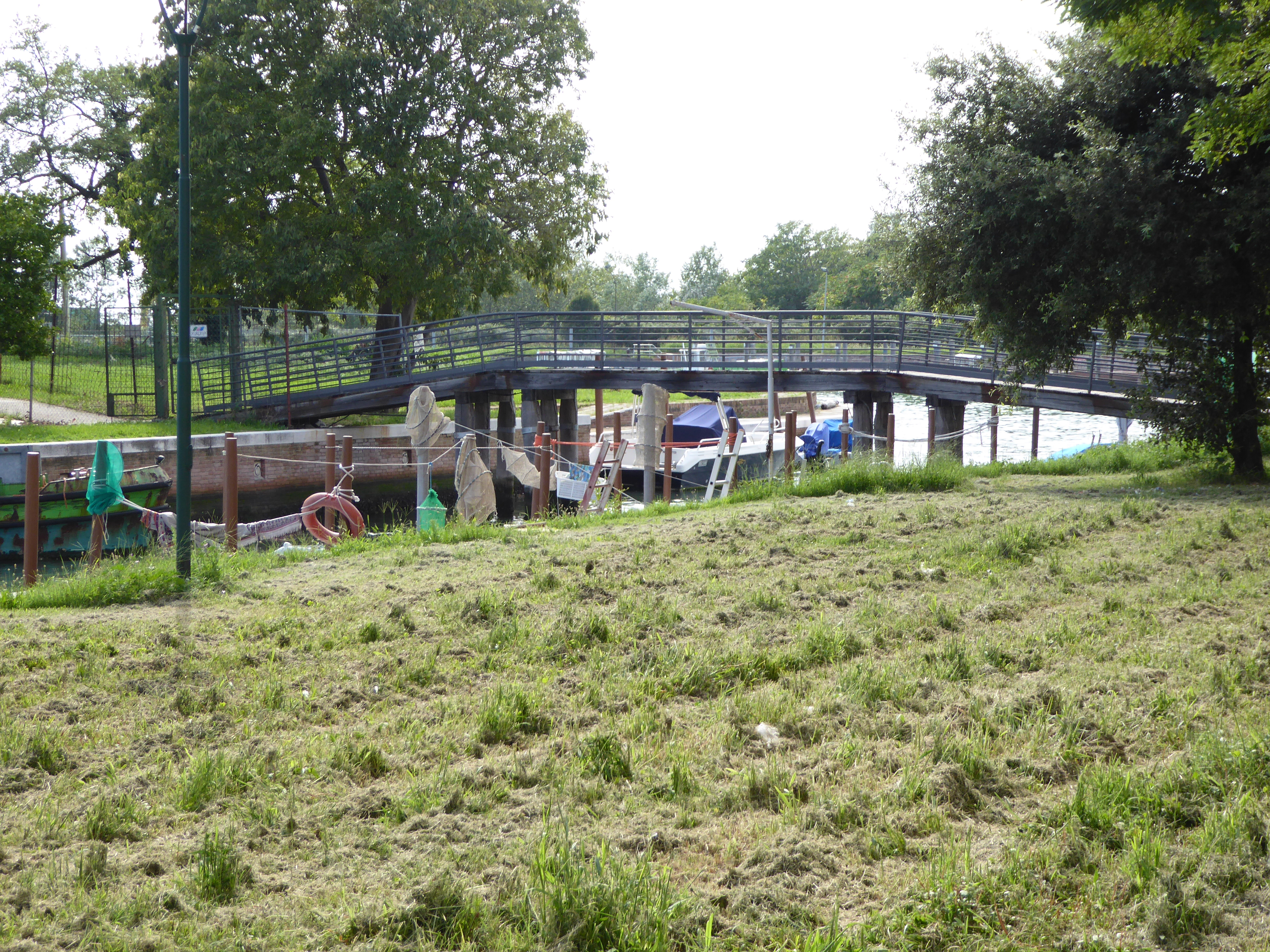
private bridge of the waste management company Veritas
Rio de Sacca Fisola

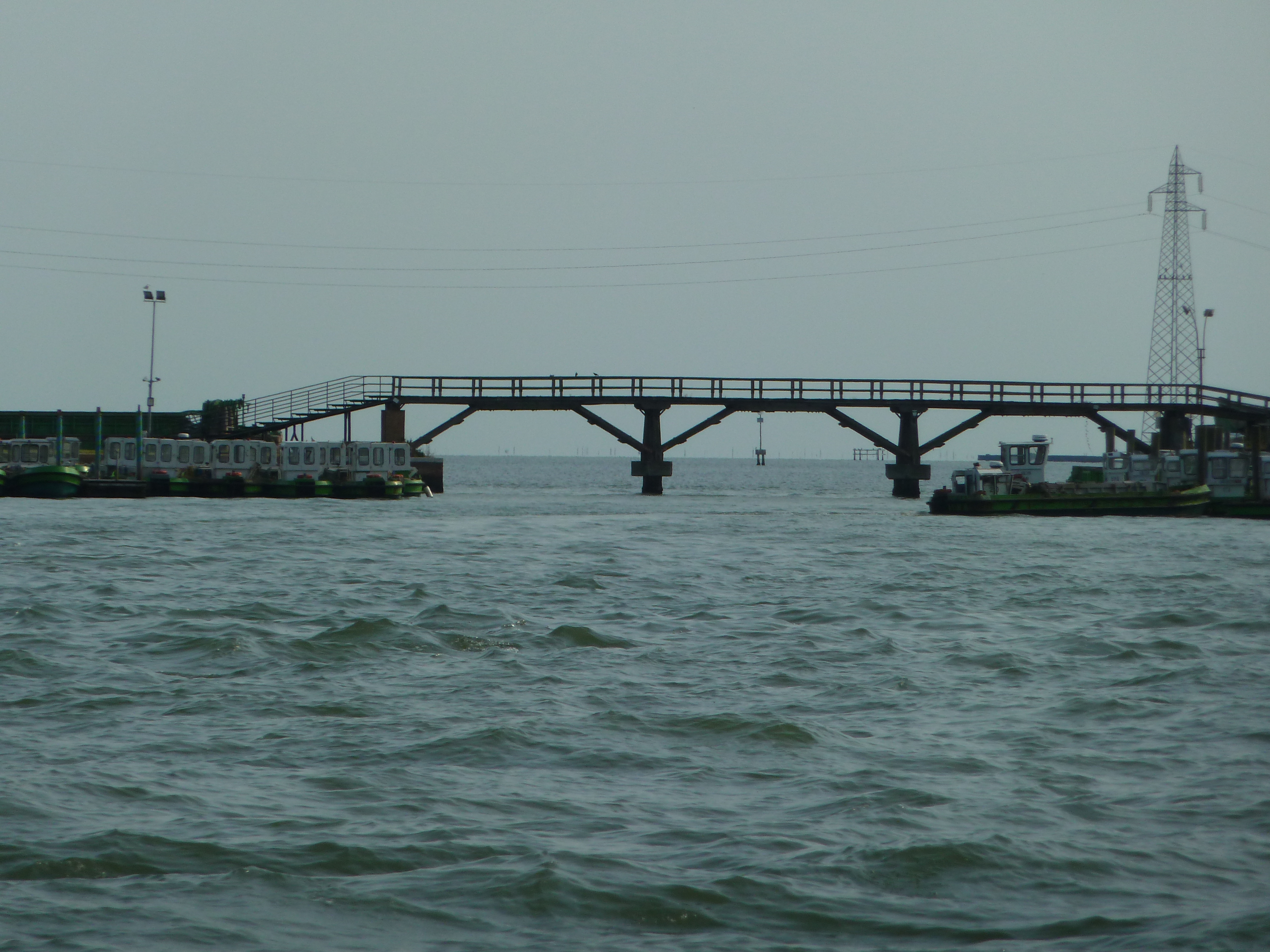
Bridge to the incinerator on Sacca San Biagio

== Murano ==
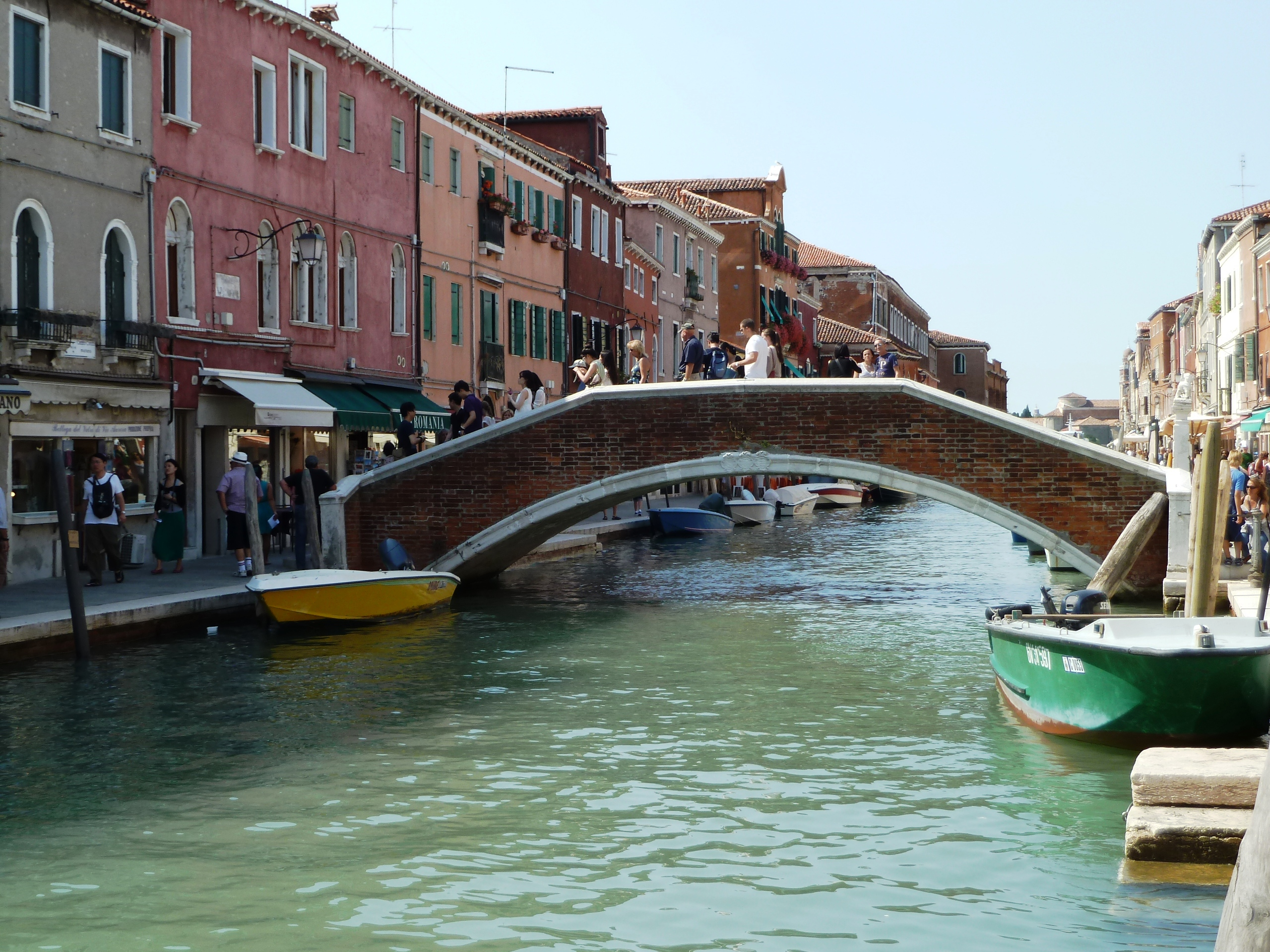
Ponte Ballarin o de Mezo, rio dei Vetrai.

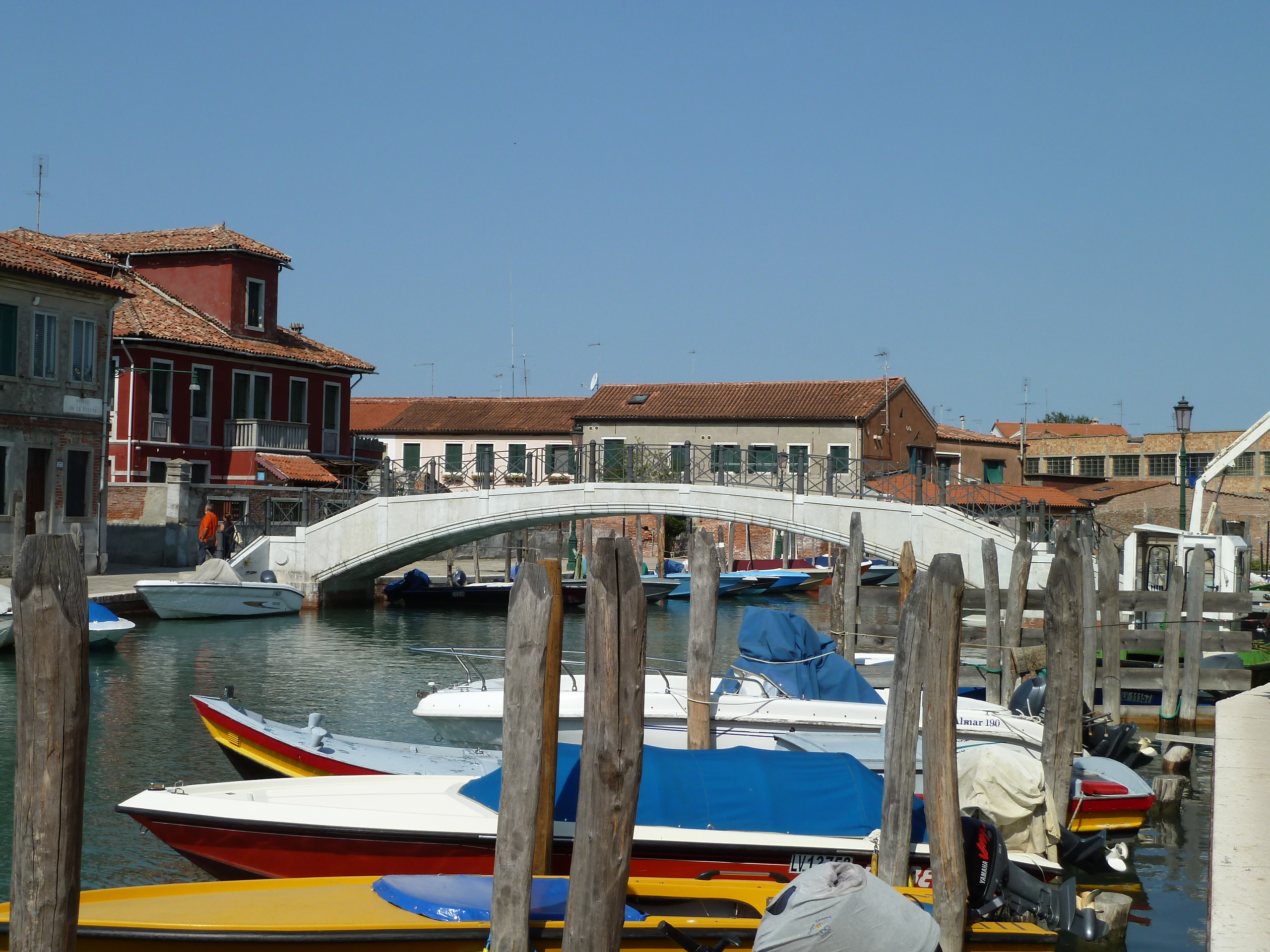
Ponte de le Terese o Abate Zanetti, Canale San Donato.

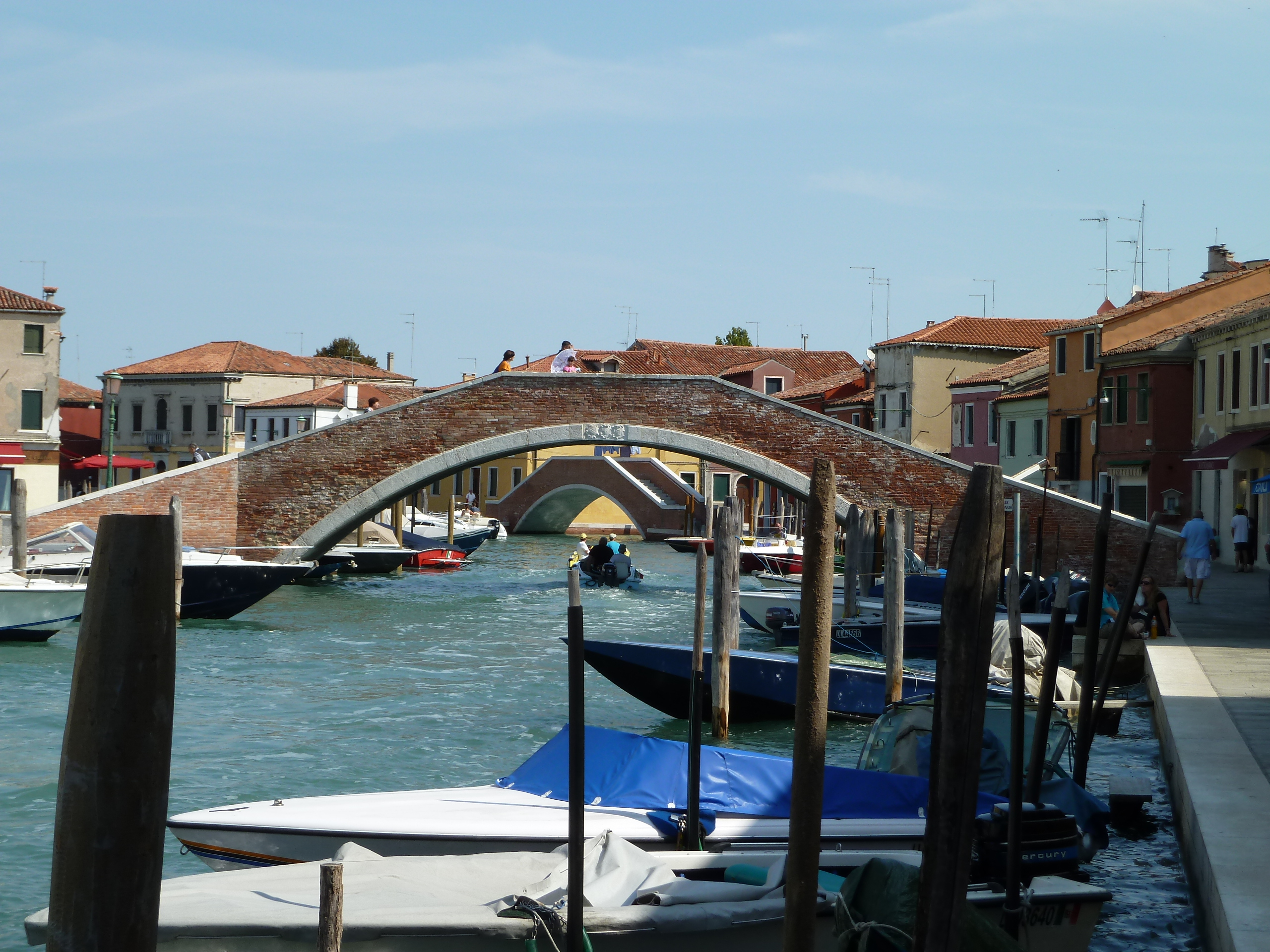
Ponte San Donato, Canale San Donato.

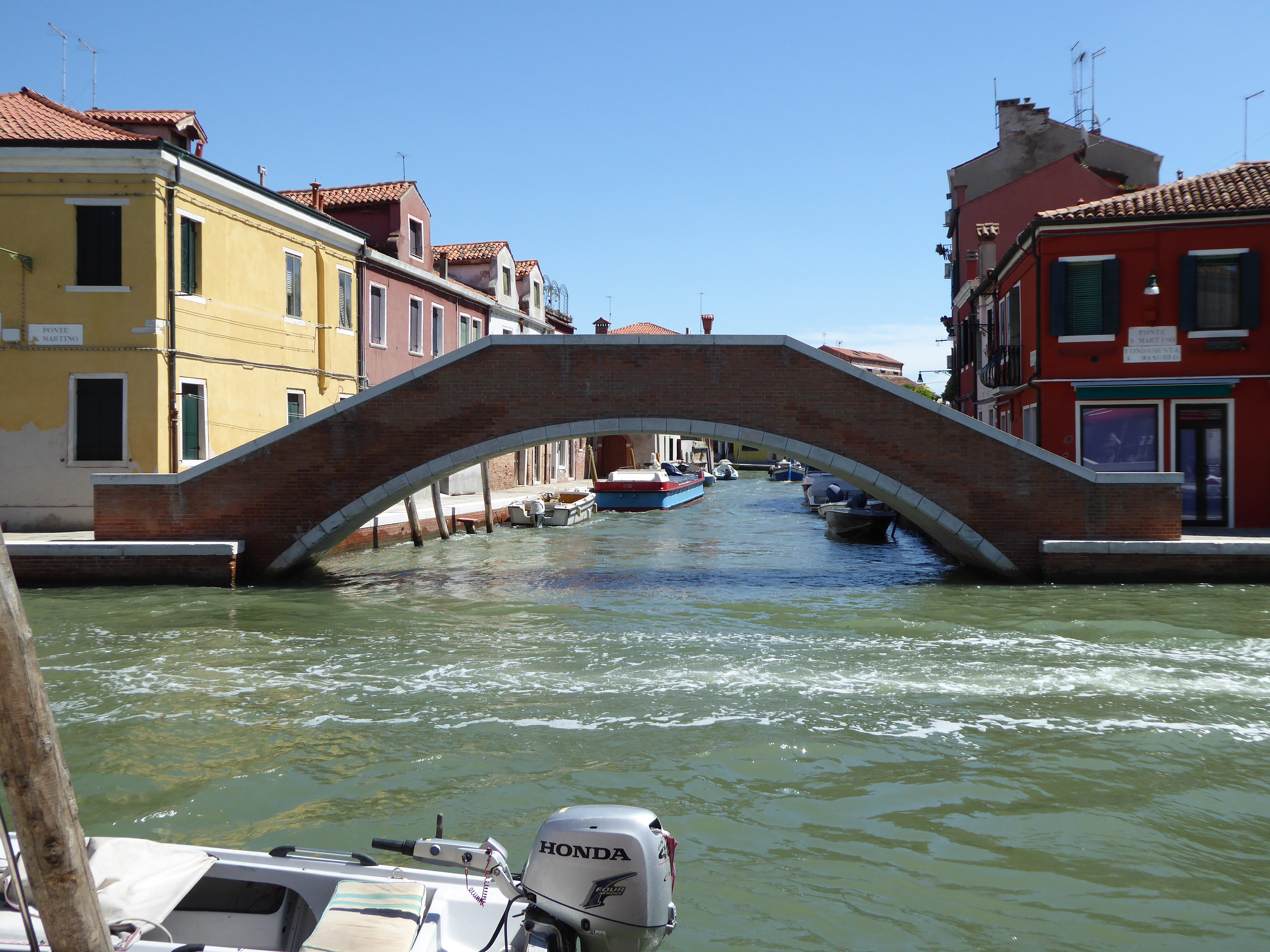
Ponte San Martino, Rio San Matteo.

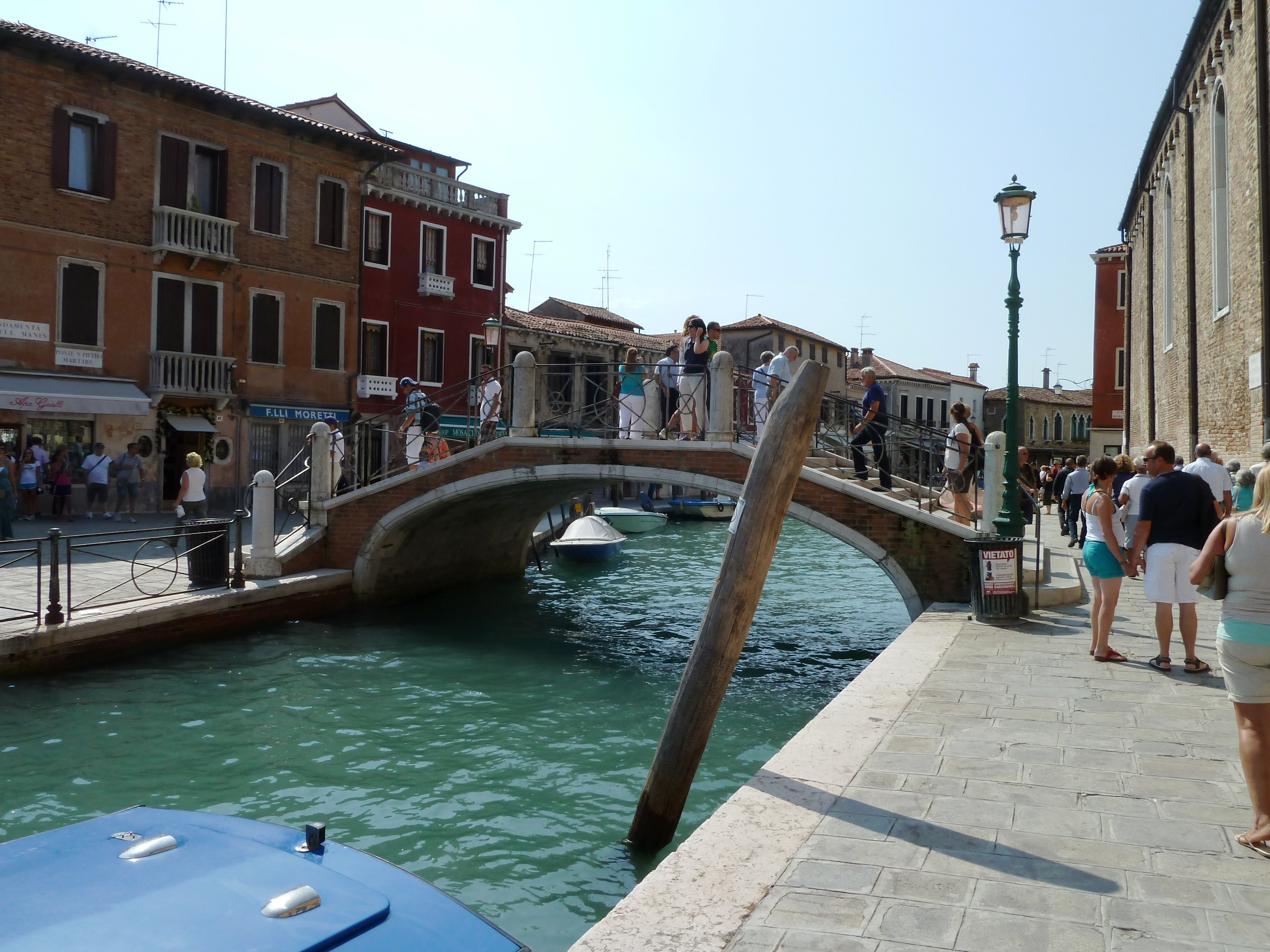
Ponte di San Pietro Martire, rio dei Vetrai.

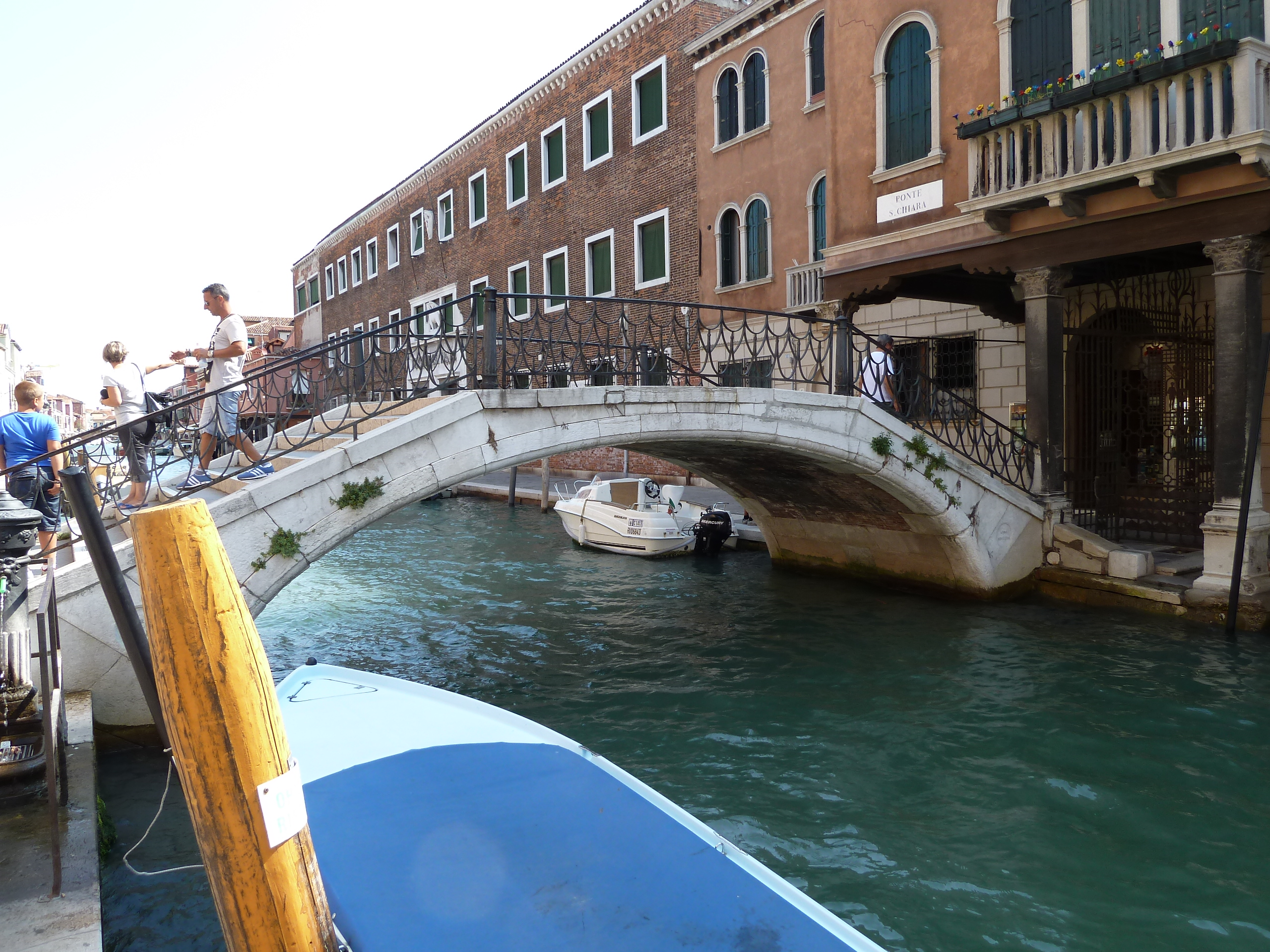
Ponte Santa Chiara, rio dei Vetrai.

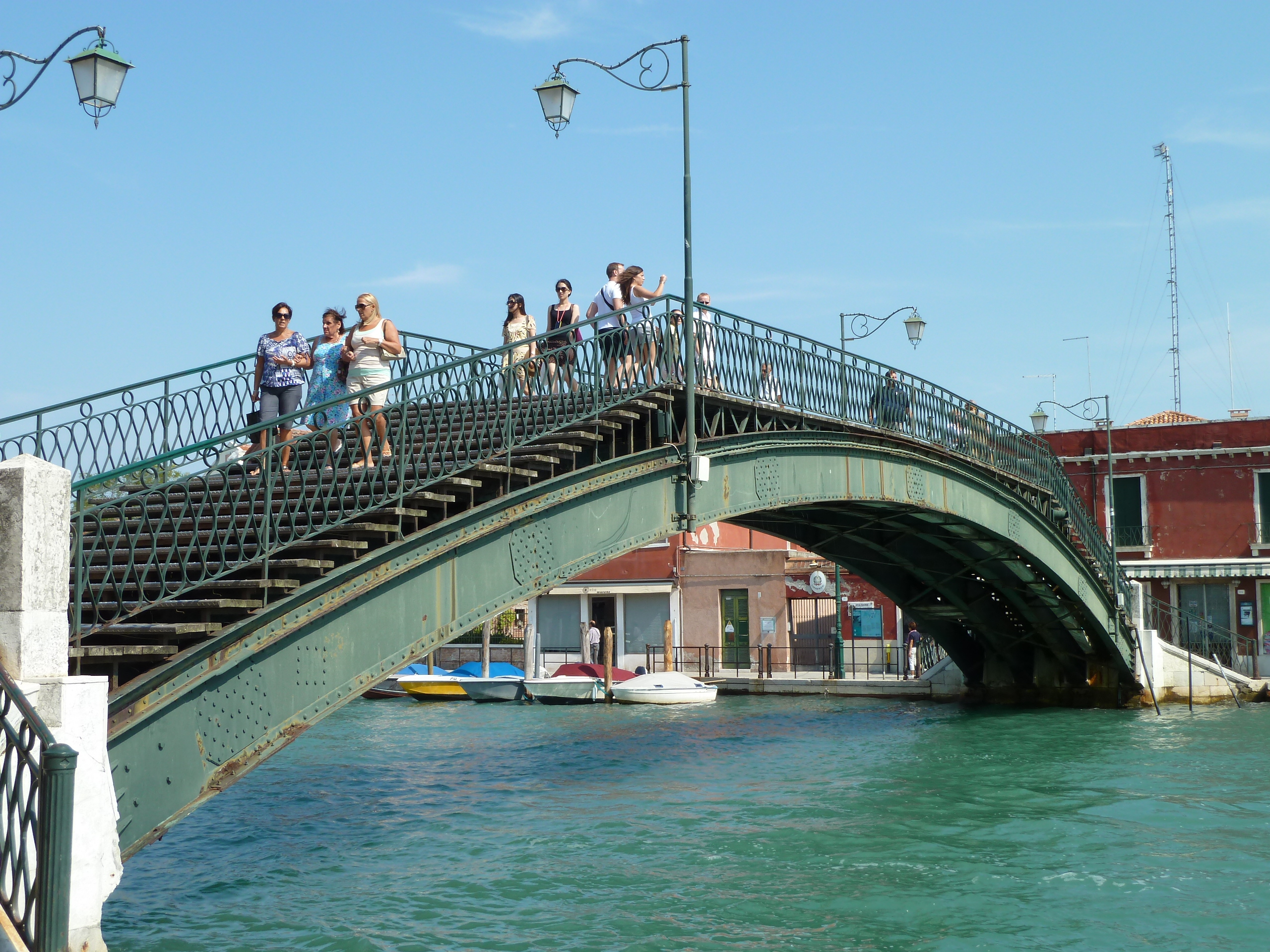
Ponte Longo o Vivarini, Canale Ponte Longo.

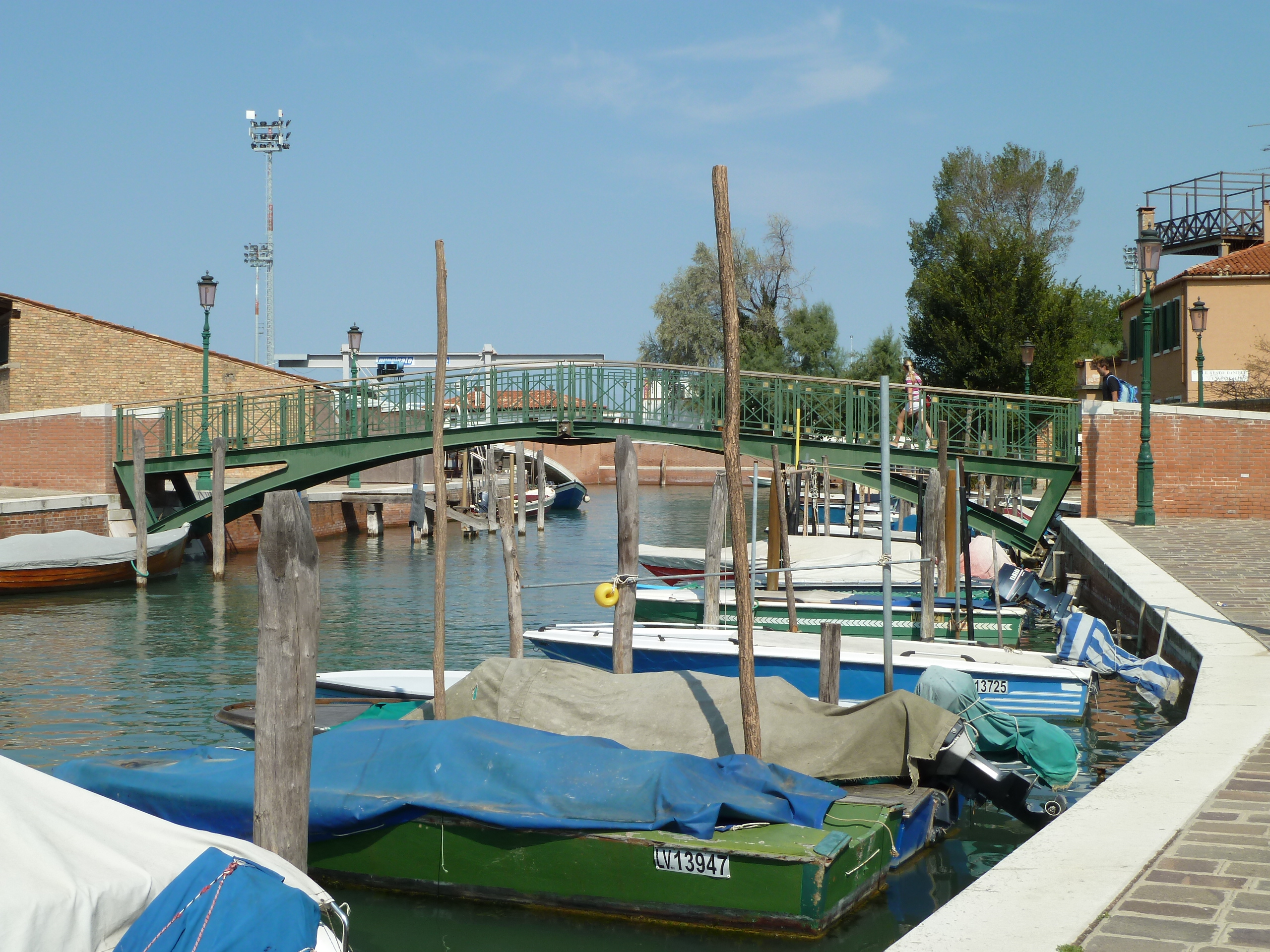
Ponte Angelo Zaniol, Canale San Donato.

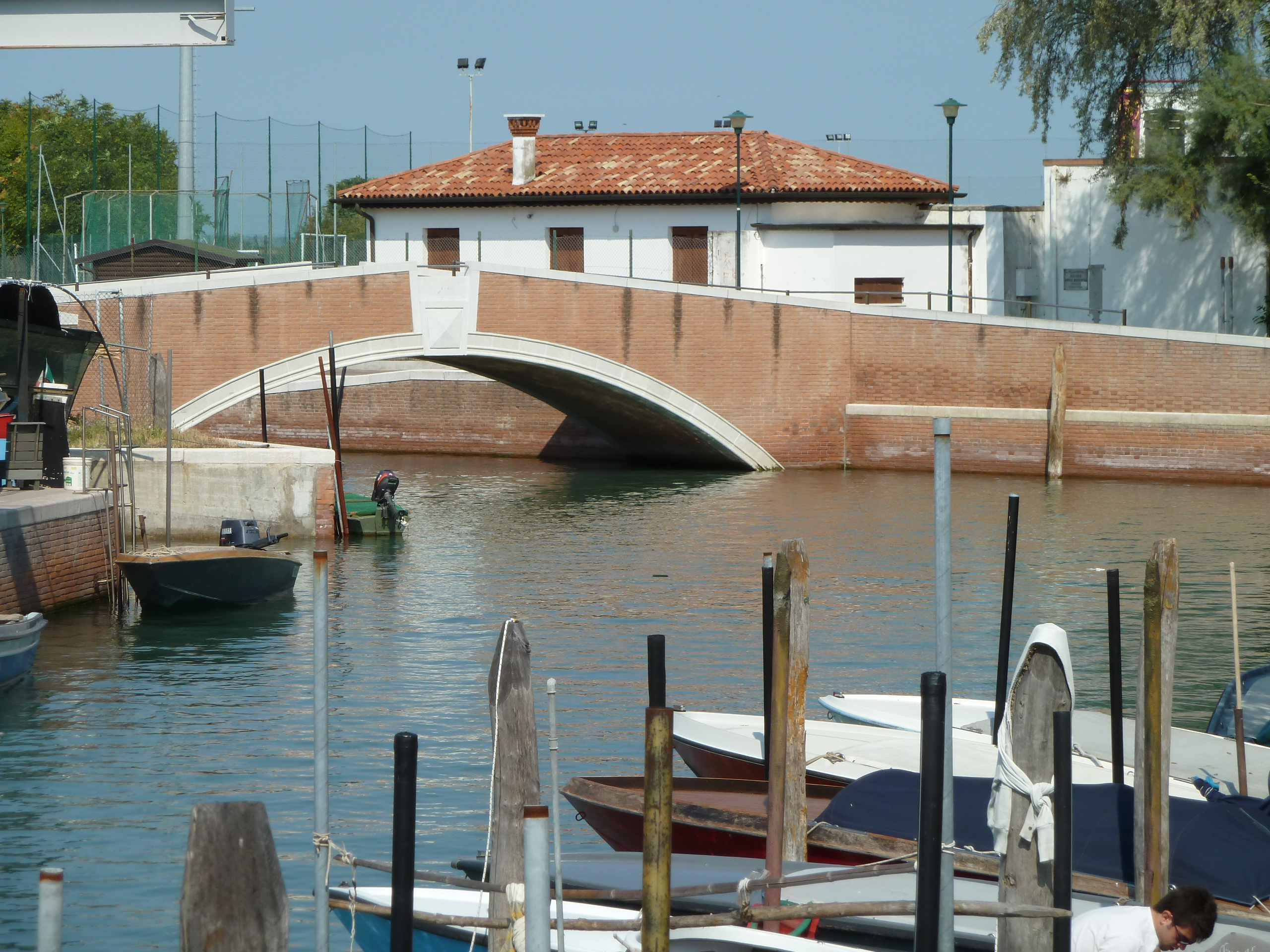
Ponte del Campo Sportivo, canale di San Mattia.

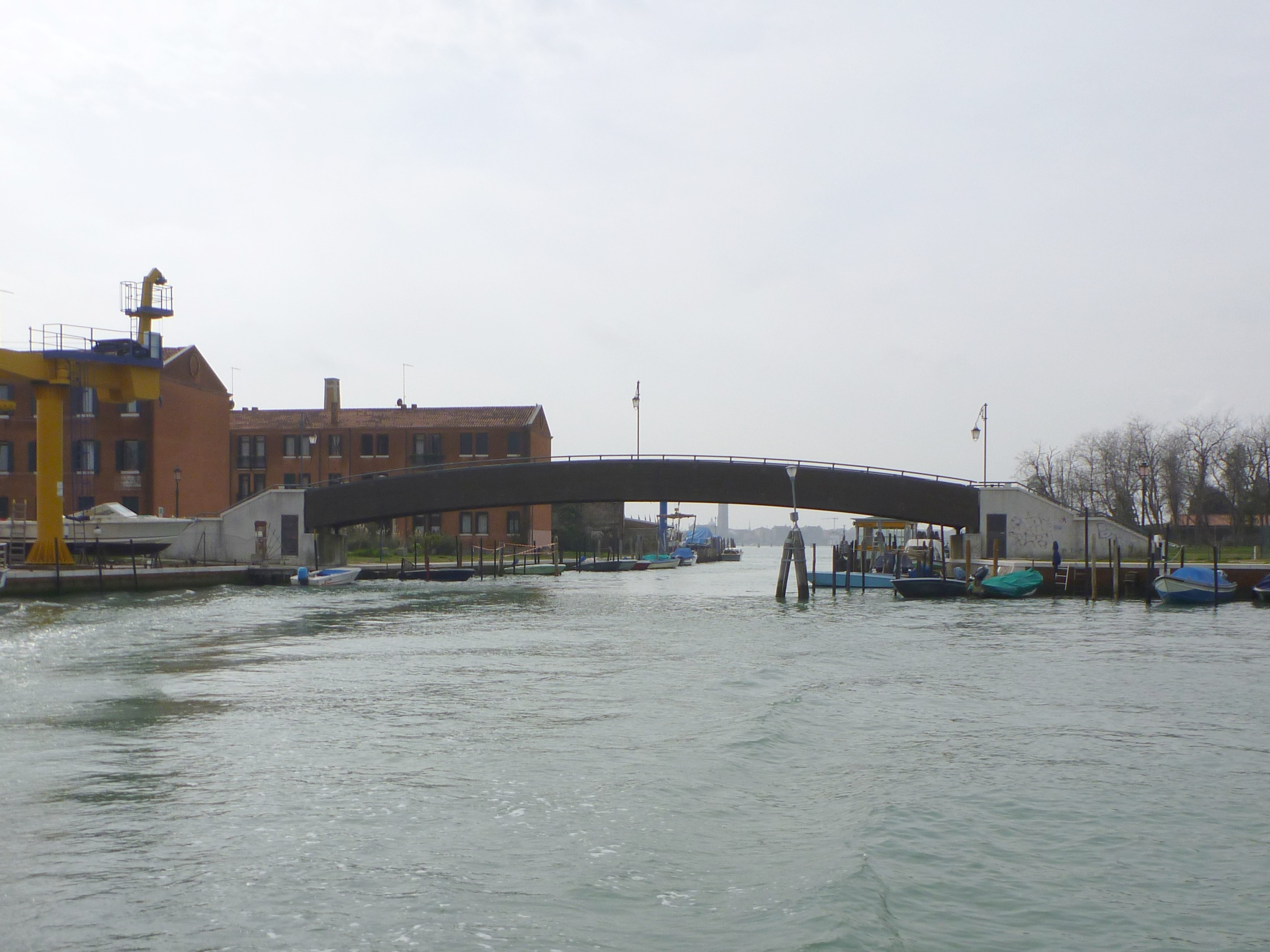
Ponte Serenella, canale Serenella

== Burano ==
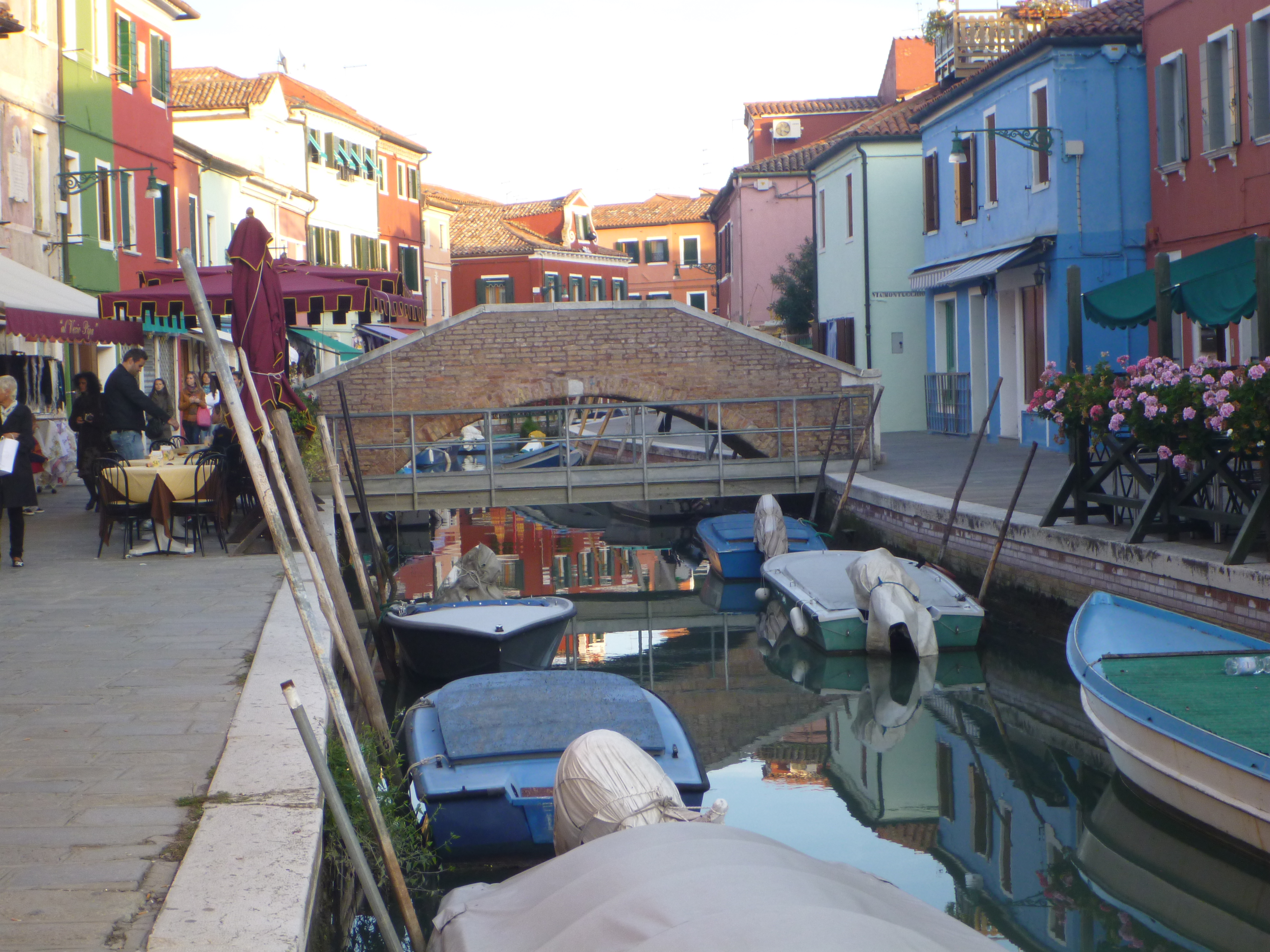
Ponte Assassini
rio Assassini

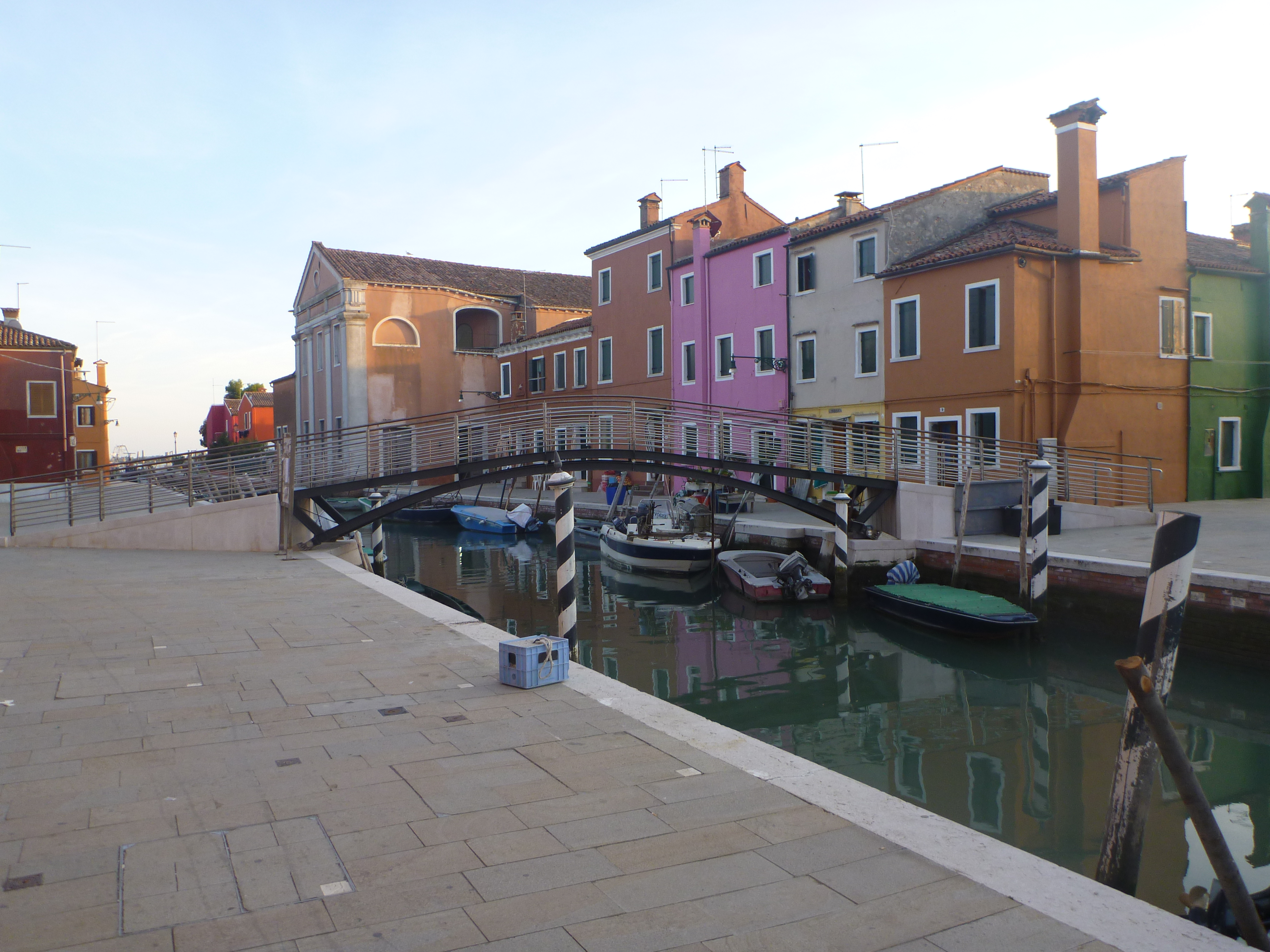
Ponte Capuccine
rio Giudecca (Zueca)

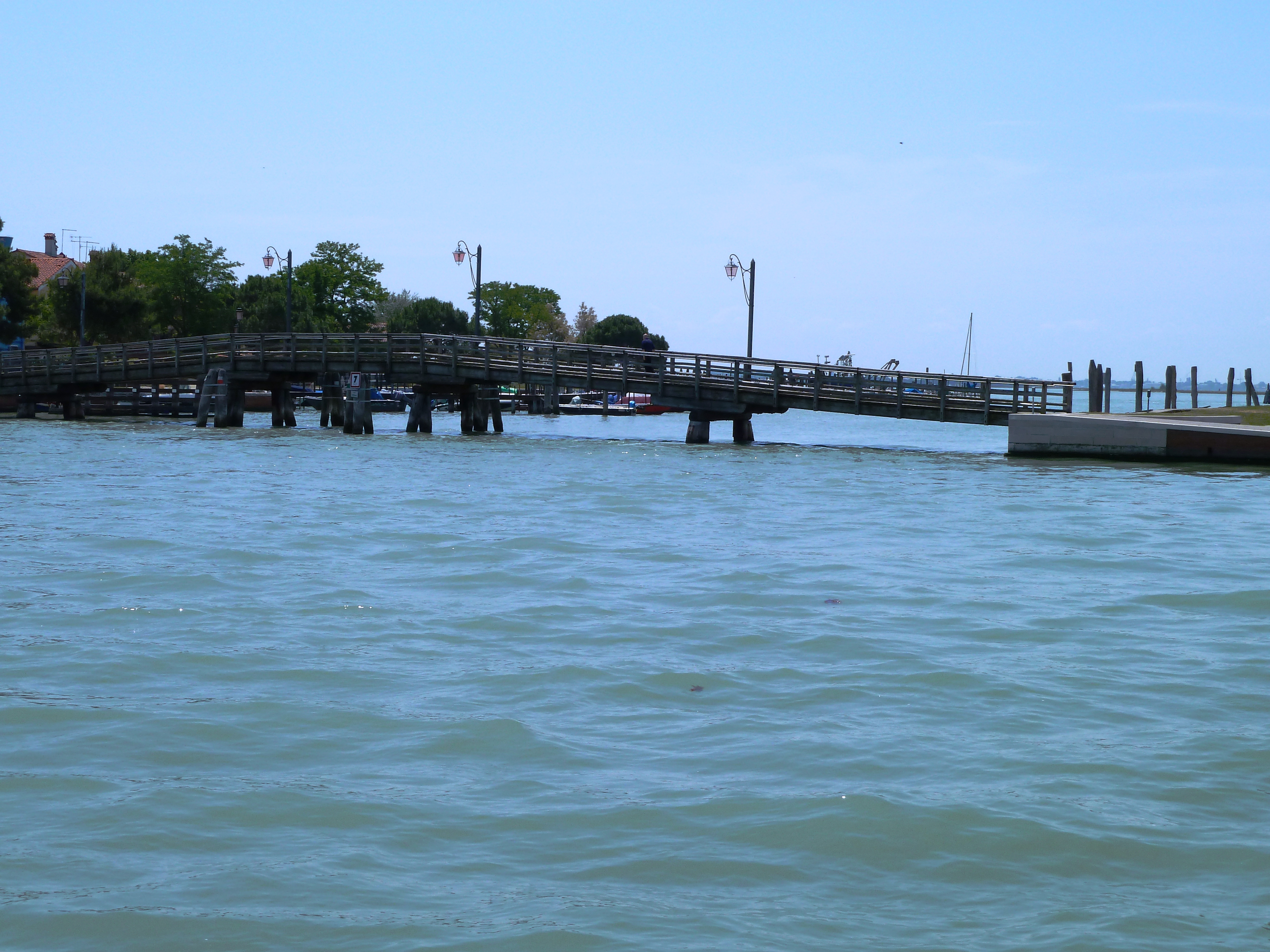
Ponte Longo (vers Mazzorbo)
rio San Giuseppe

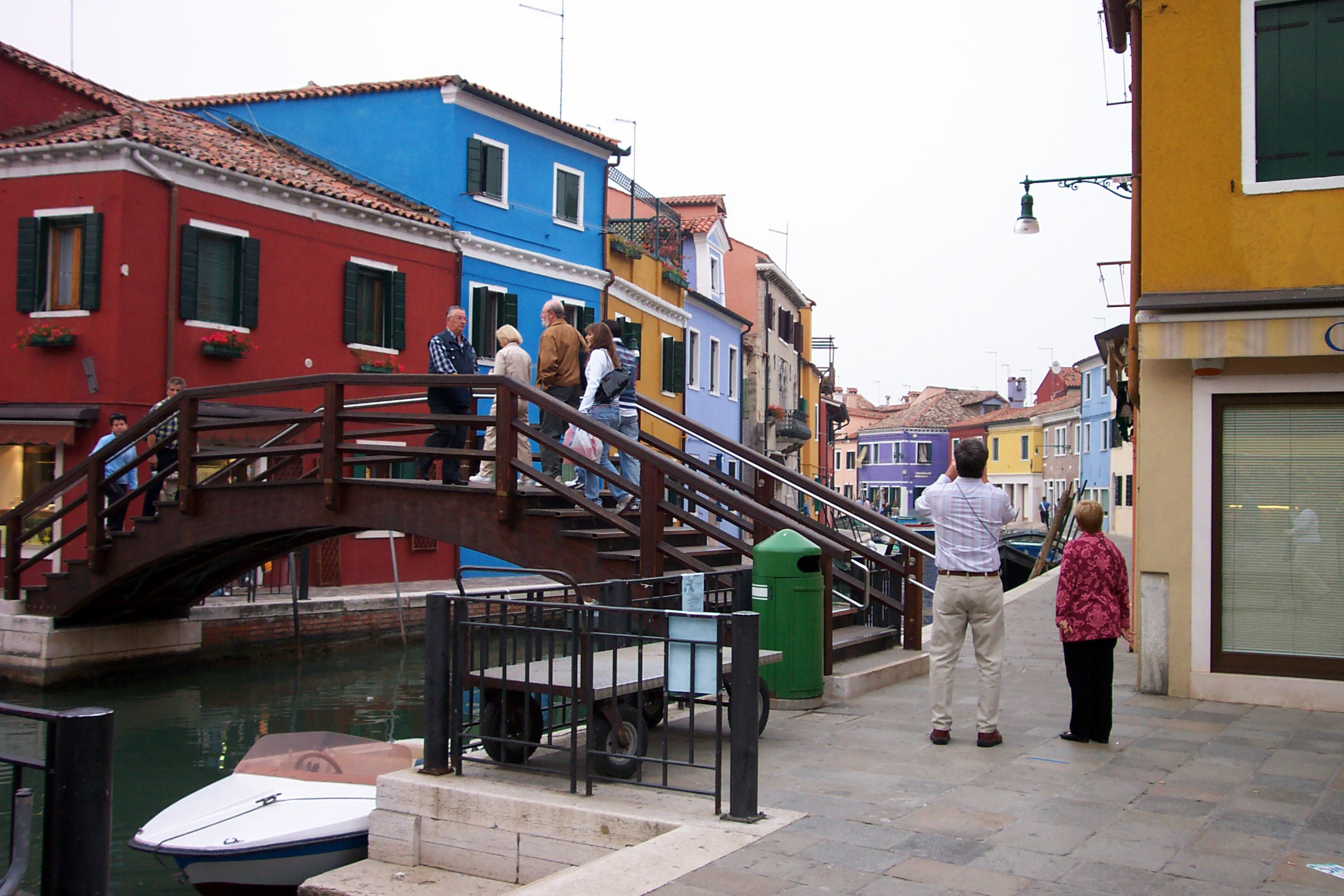
Ponte San Mauro
rio Assassini et Rio Pontinello
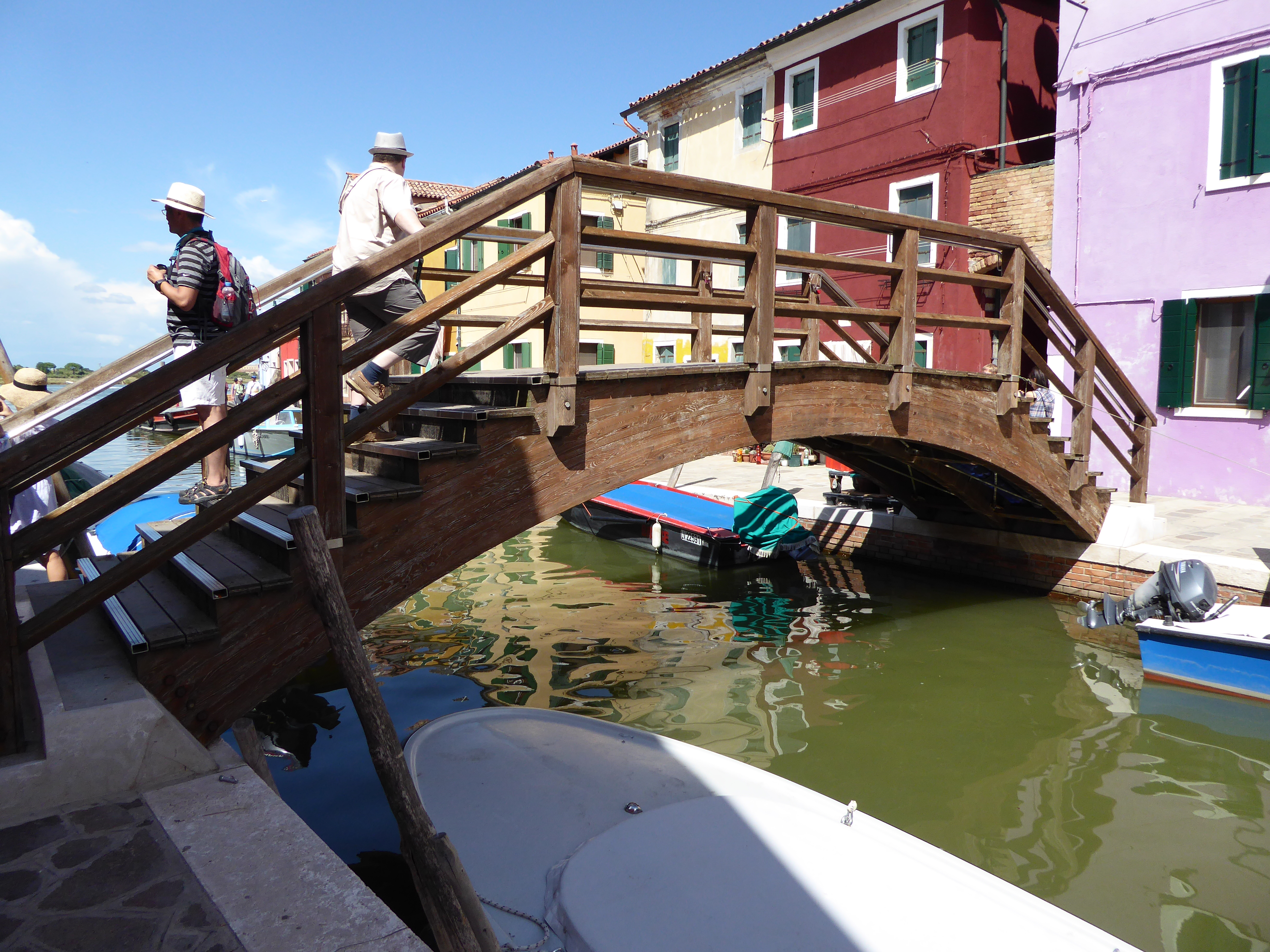
Ponte Pontinello
rio Pontinello

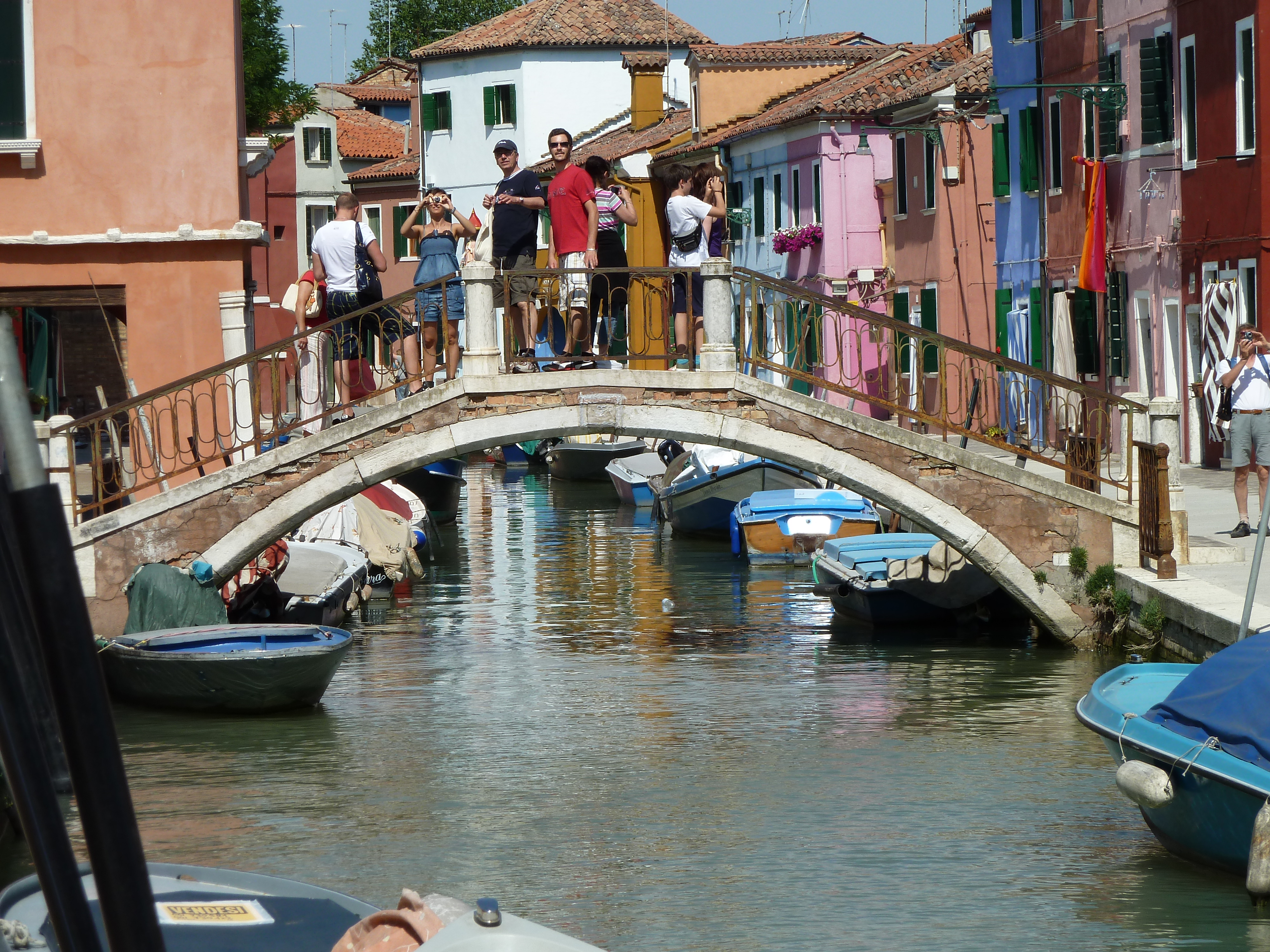
Ponte Santi
rio Terranova et rio Mandracchio

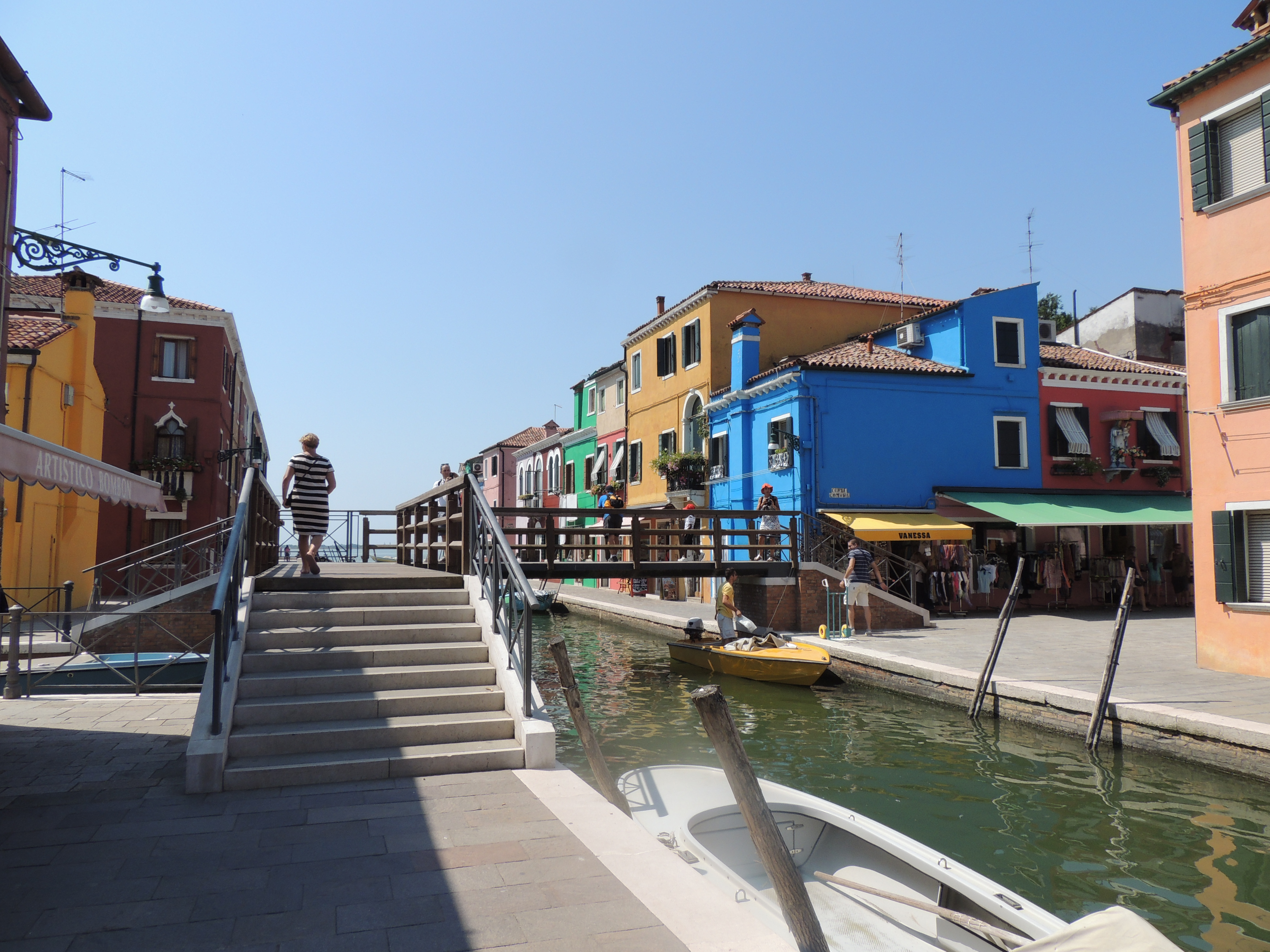
Ponte Tre Ponti
rio San Mauro

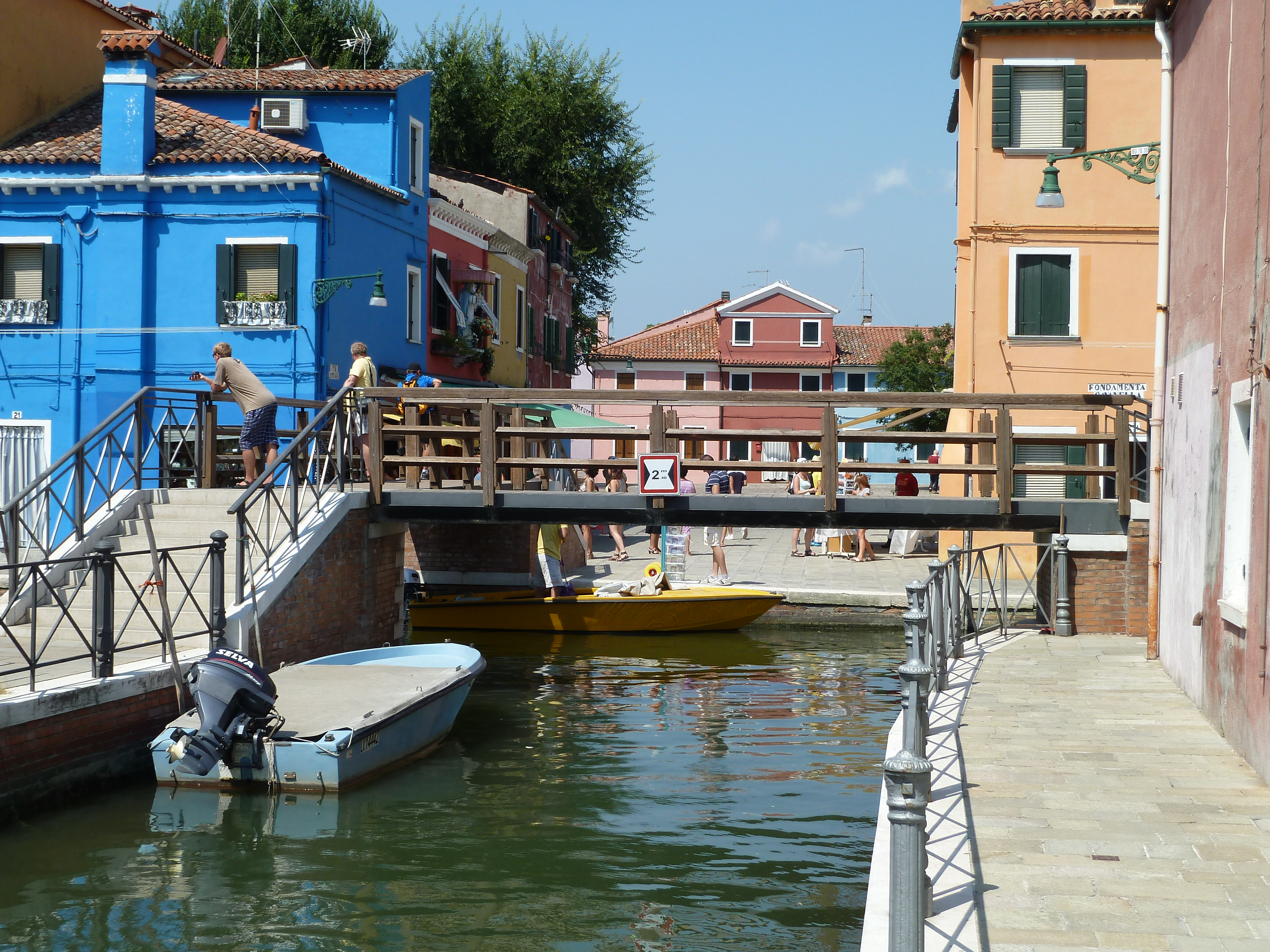
Ponte Tre Ponti
rio Giudecca (Zuecca)

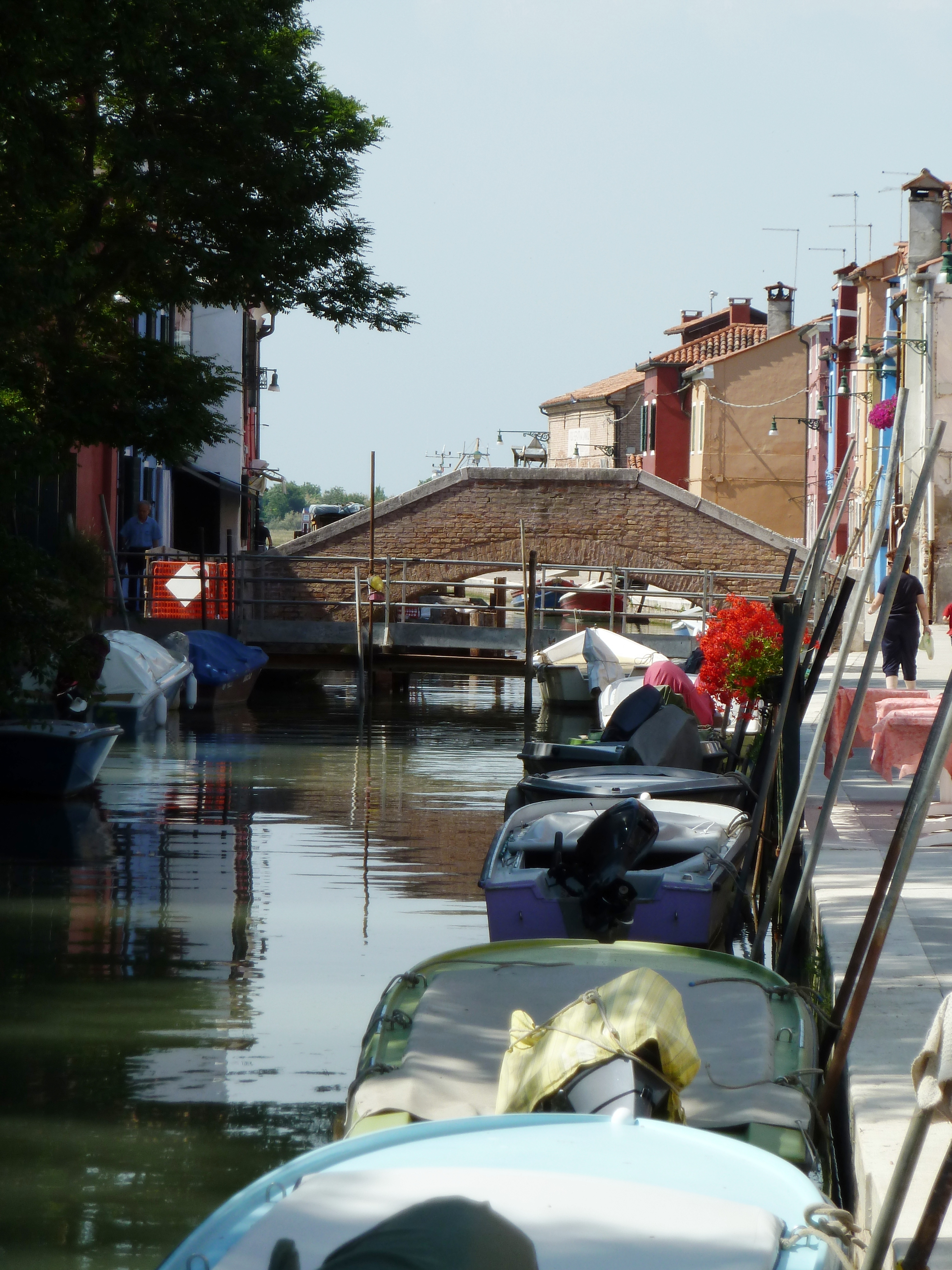
Ponte della Vigna
rio Terranova

== Torcello ==
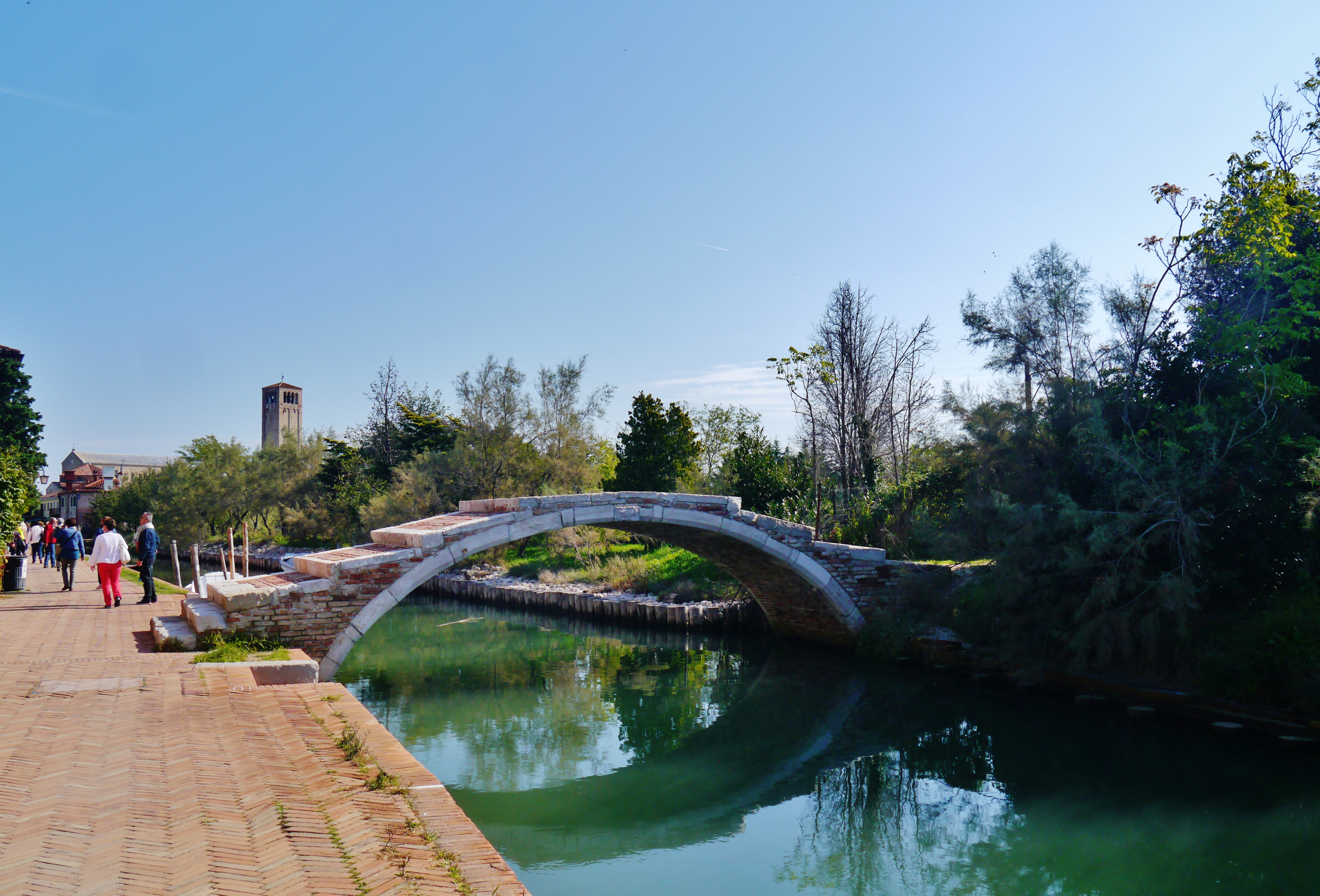
Ponte del Diavolo

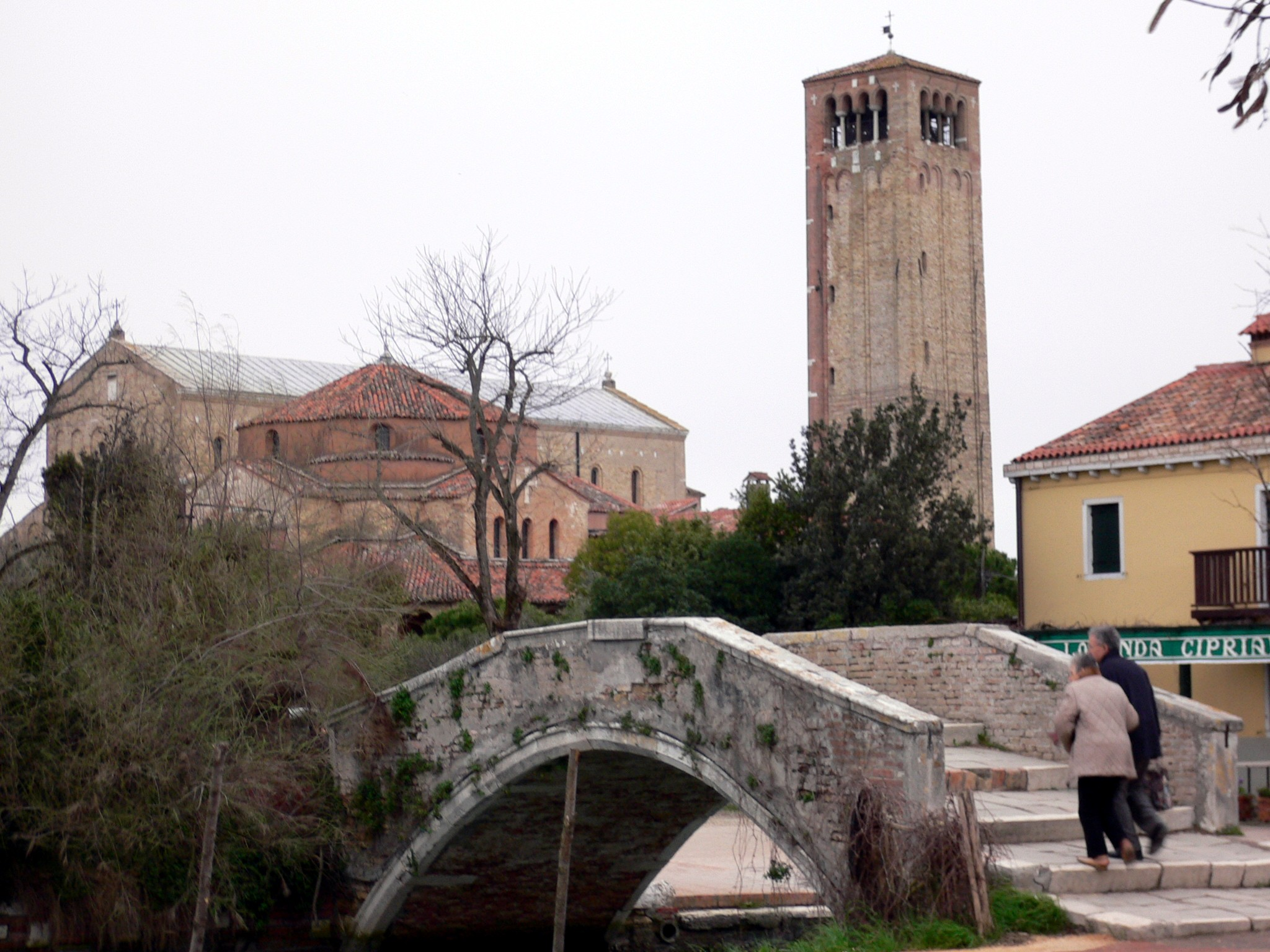
Pont Santa-Maria

== Lido di Venezia ==
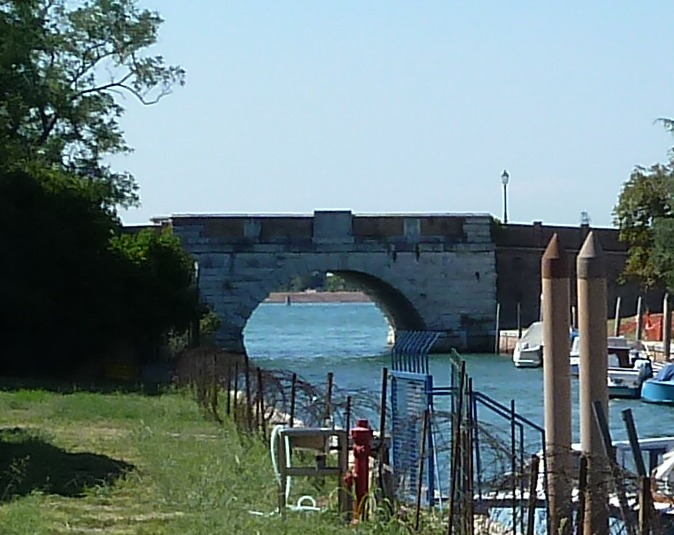
Pont de San Nicolò au rio de l'aérodrome Nicelli

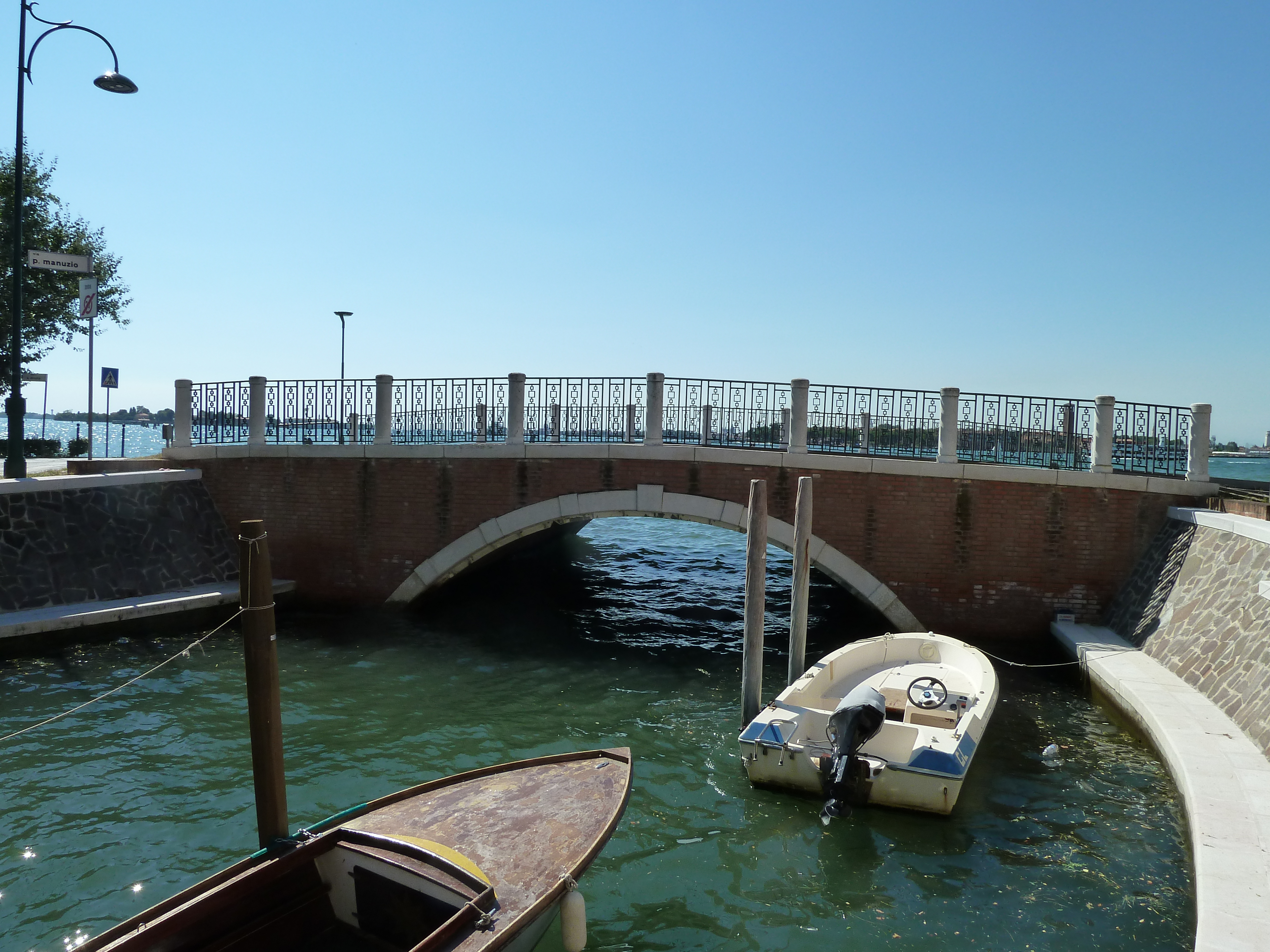
Pont au rio longeant les viale Manuzio

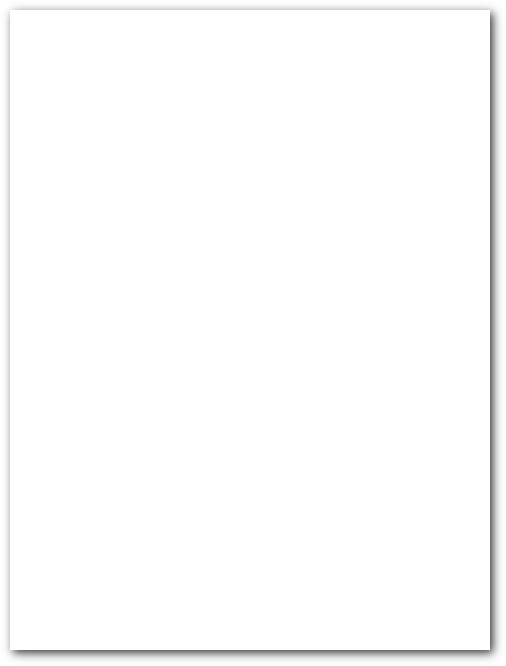
Pont via Francesco Duodo

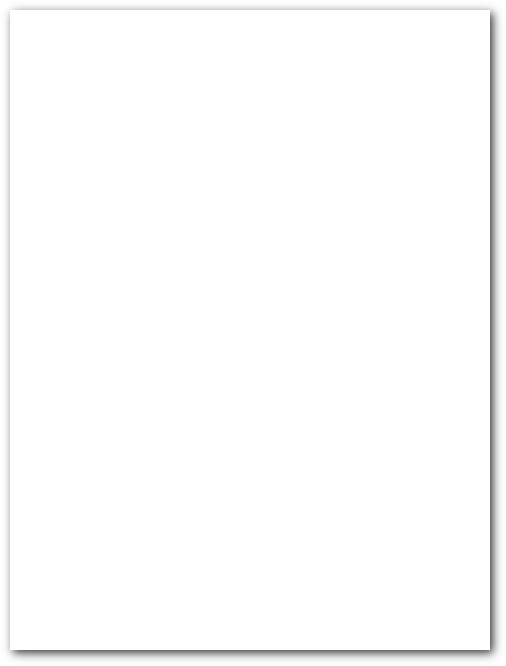
Pont entre viale Foscarini et Fra Mauro

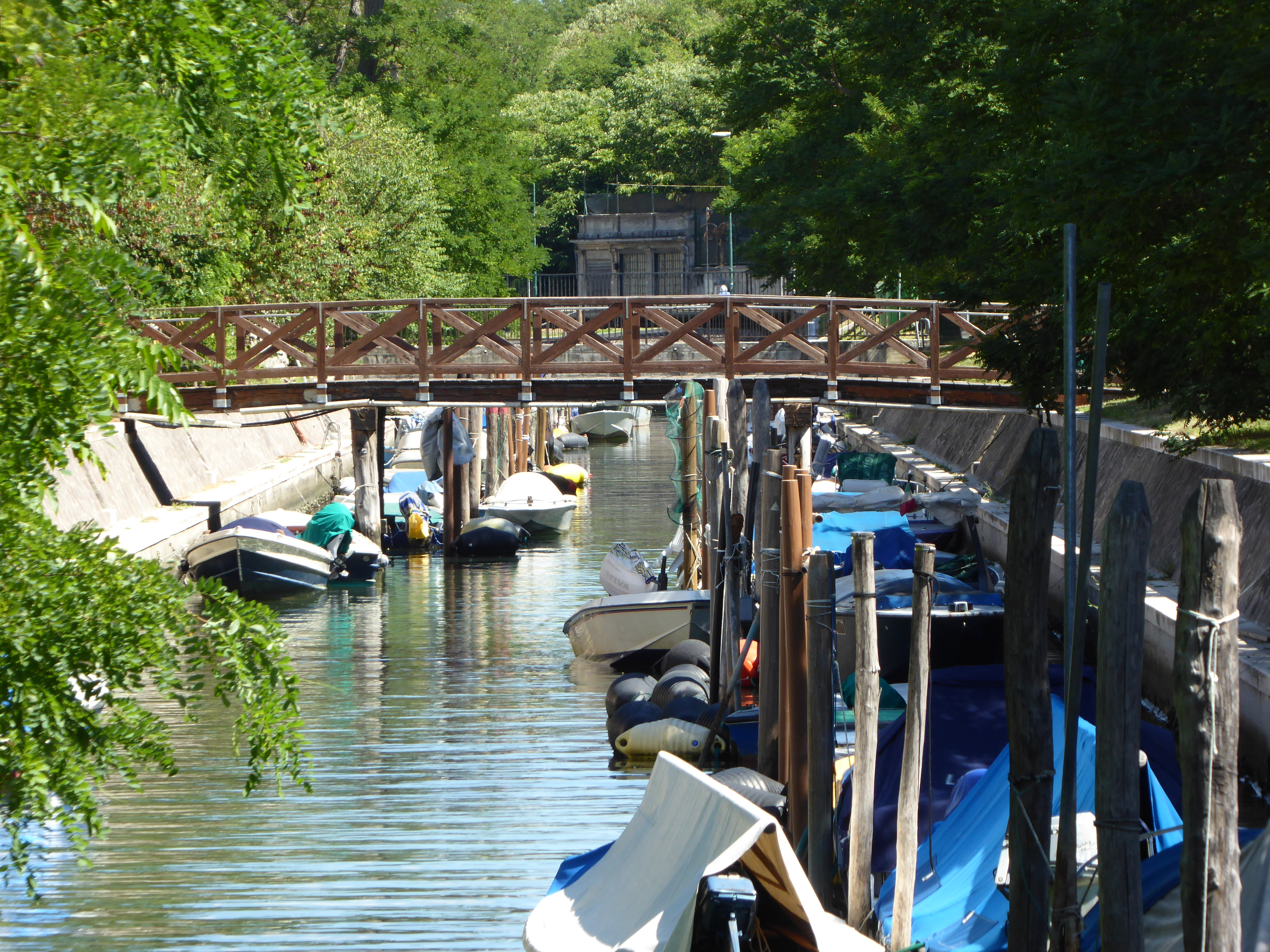
Pont piéton entre viale Caboto et Orseolo

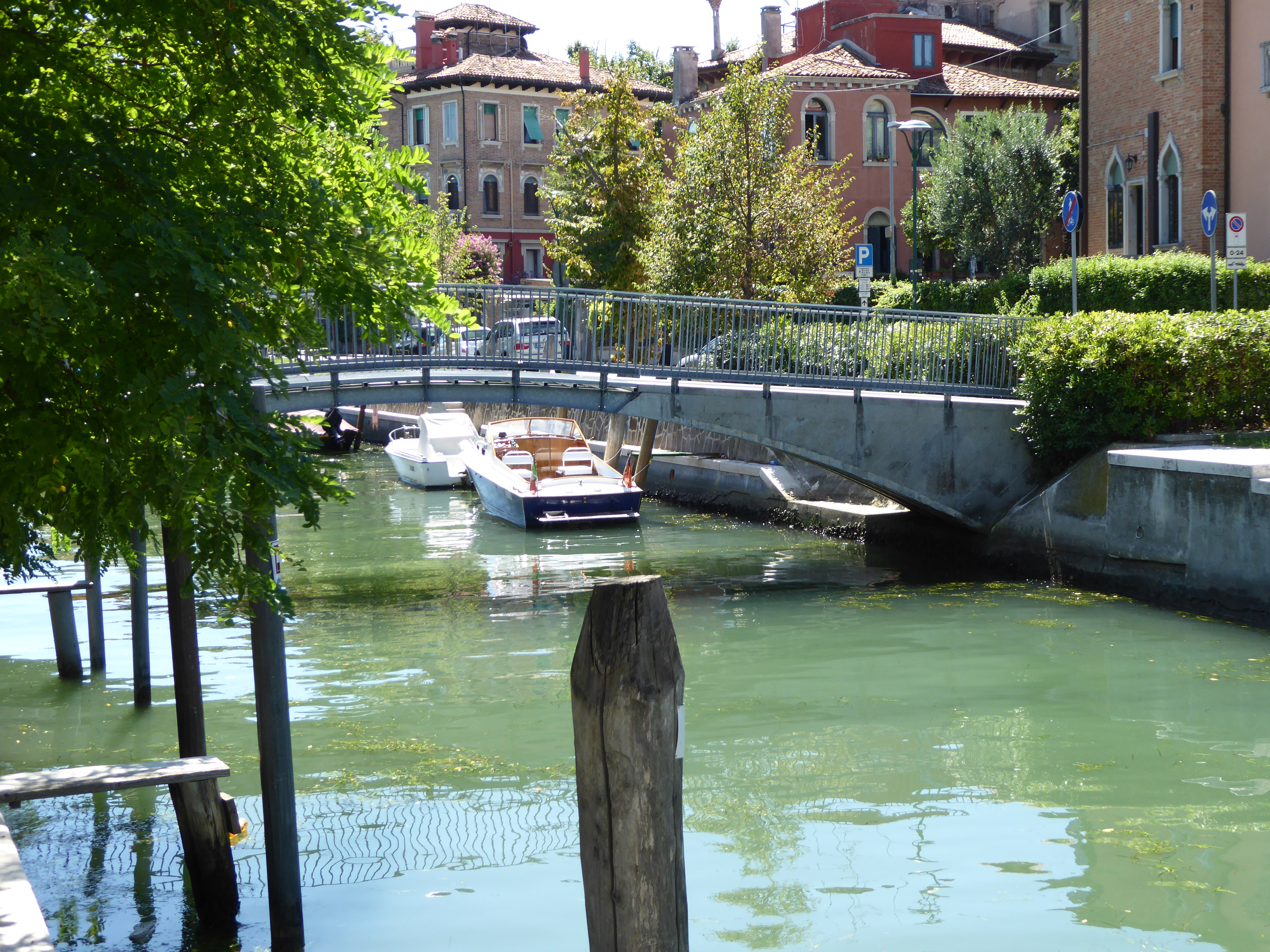
Pont piéton entre viale Smirne et Negroponte

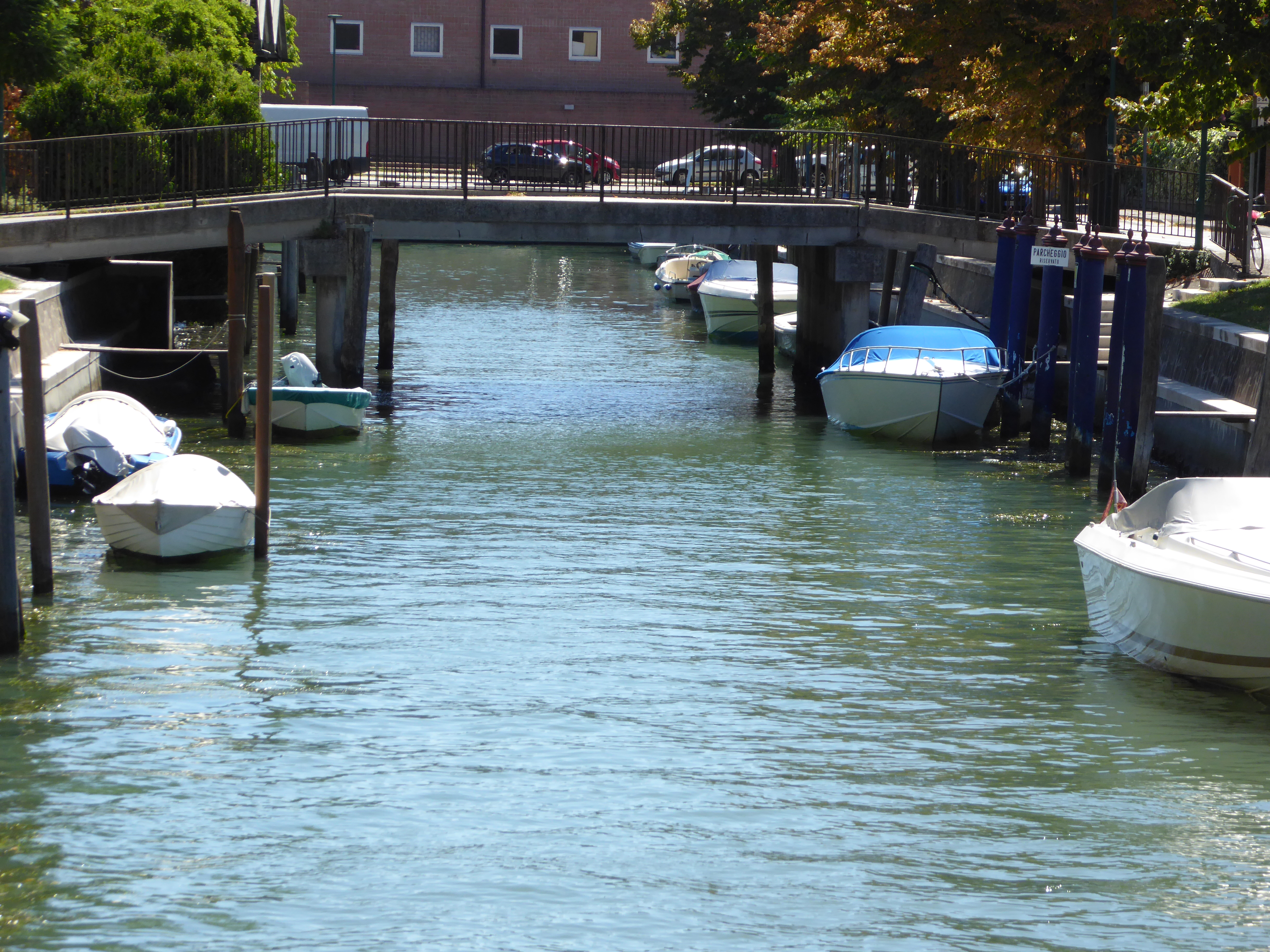
Pont entre viale Zara et Aquileia

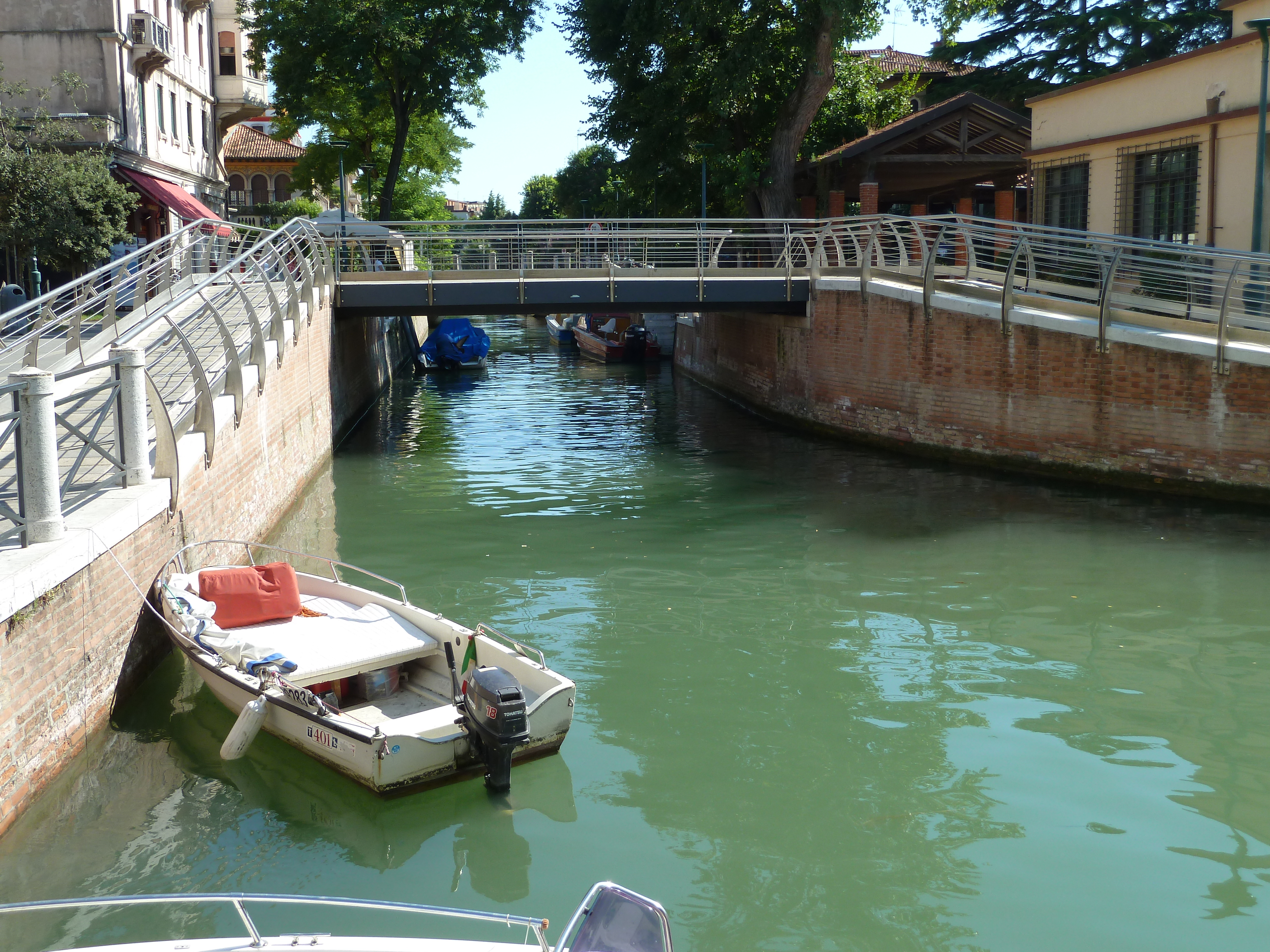
Pont piéton entre viale Lepanto et Pisani

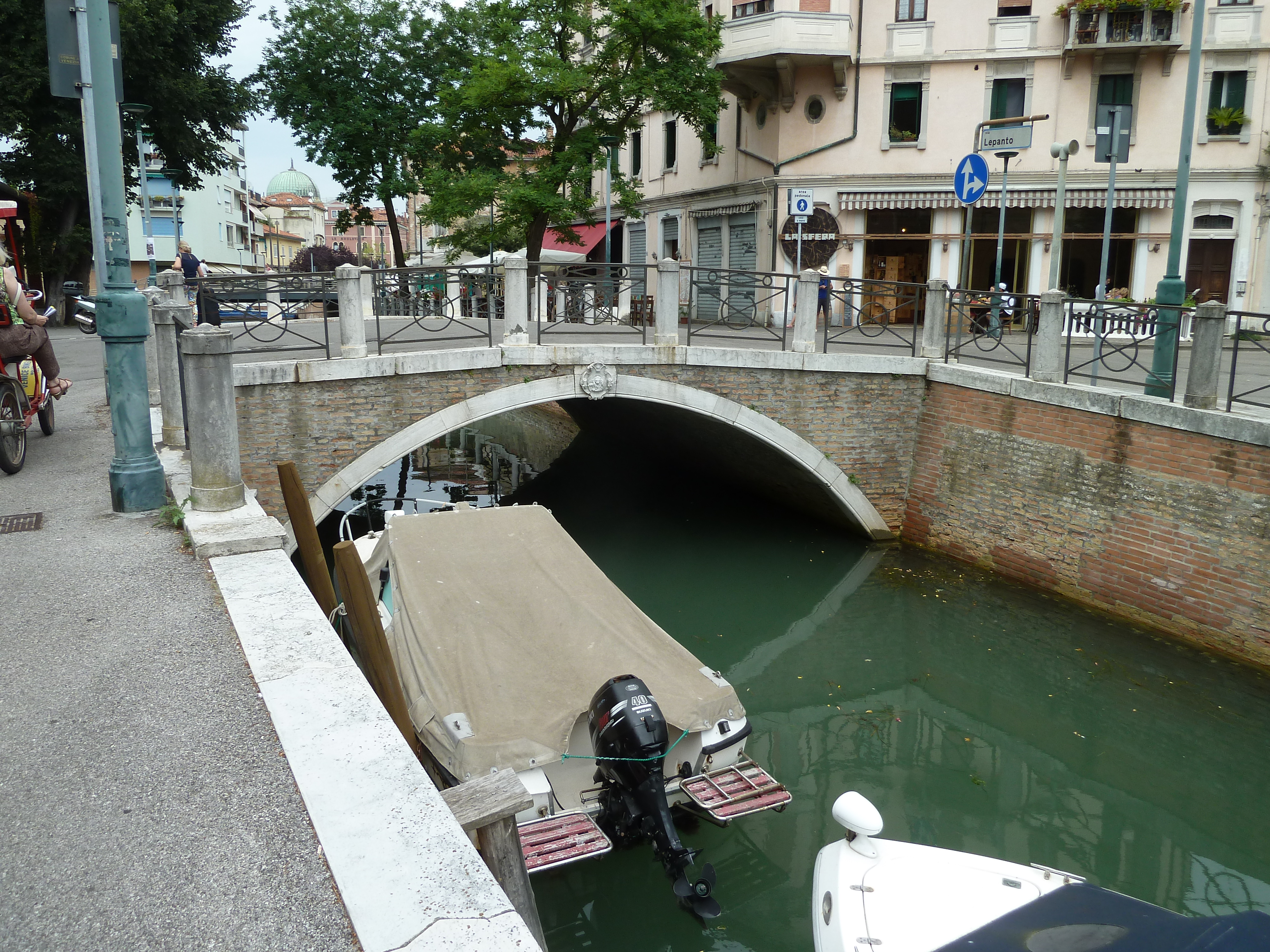
Pont via Dandolo

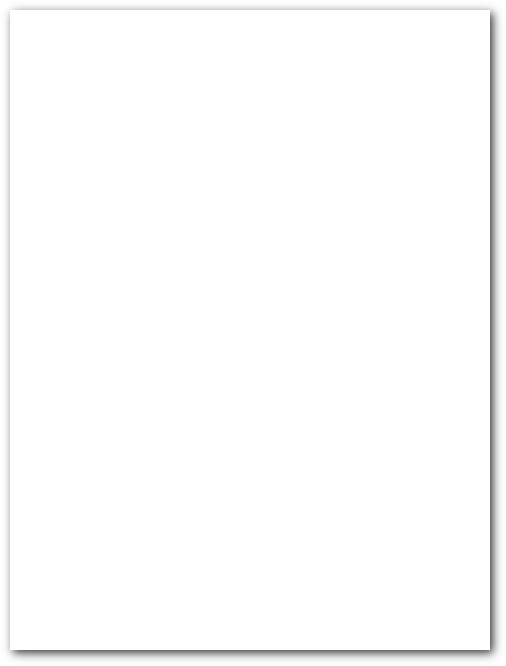
Pont piéton via Biagio Zulian

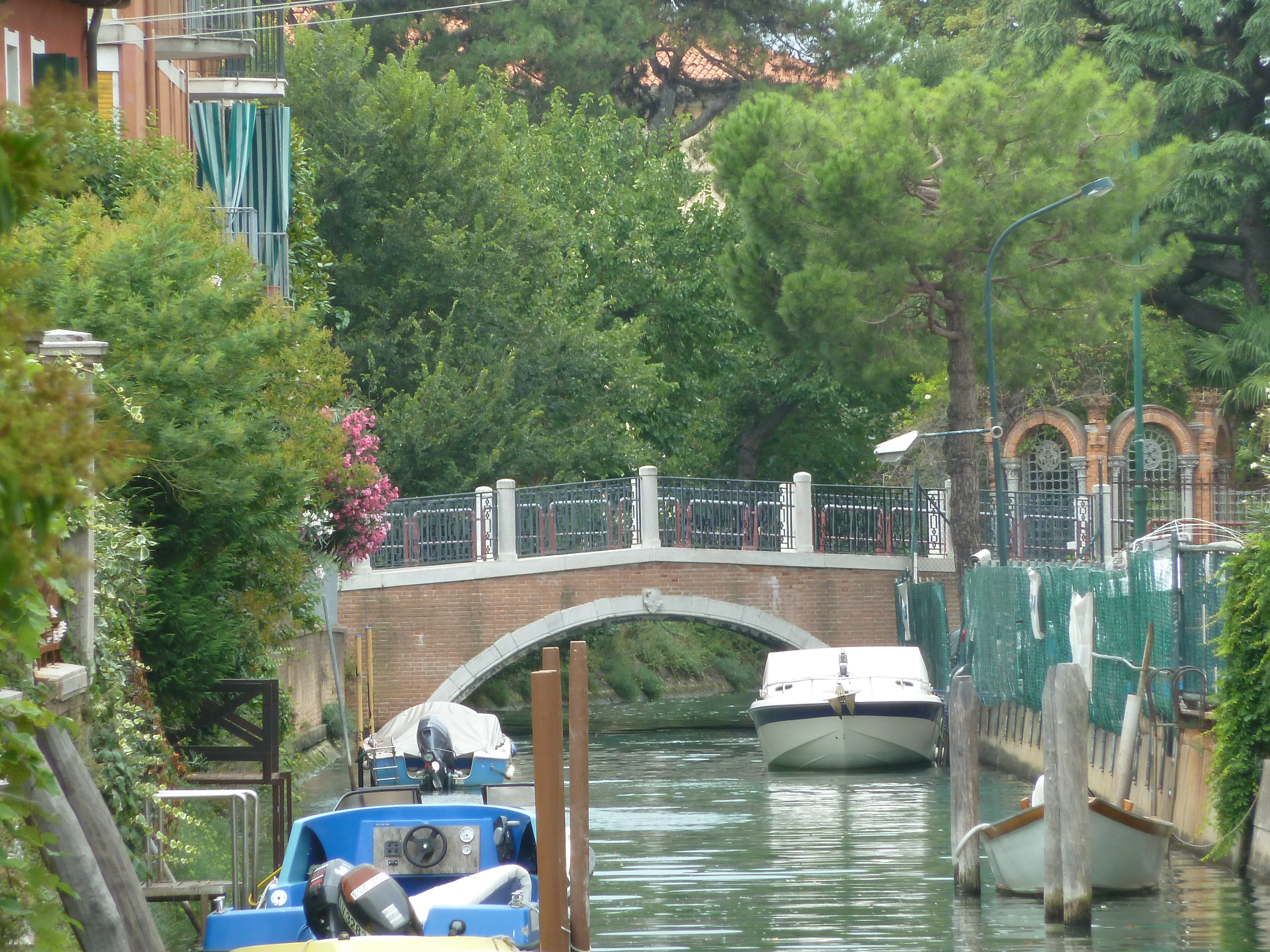
Pont sur le rio delle Scuole

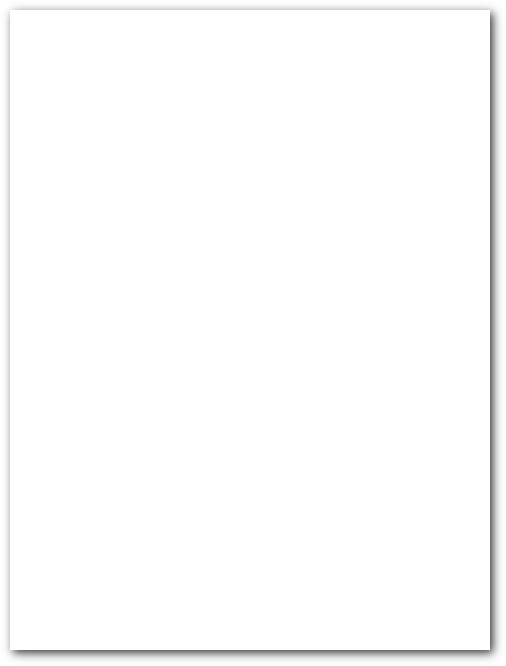
Pont via Marcantonio Bragadin

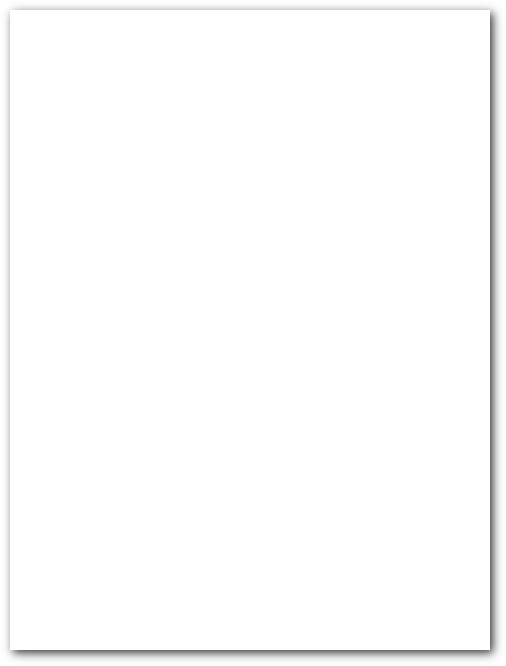
Pont via Antonio da Canal

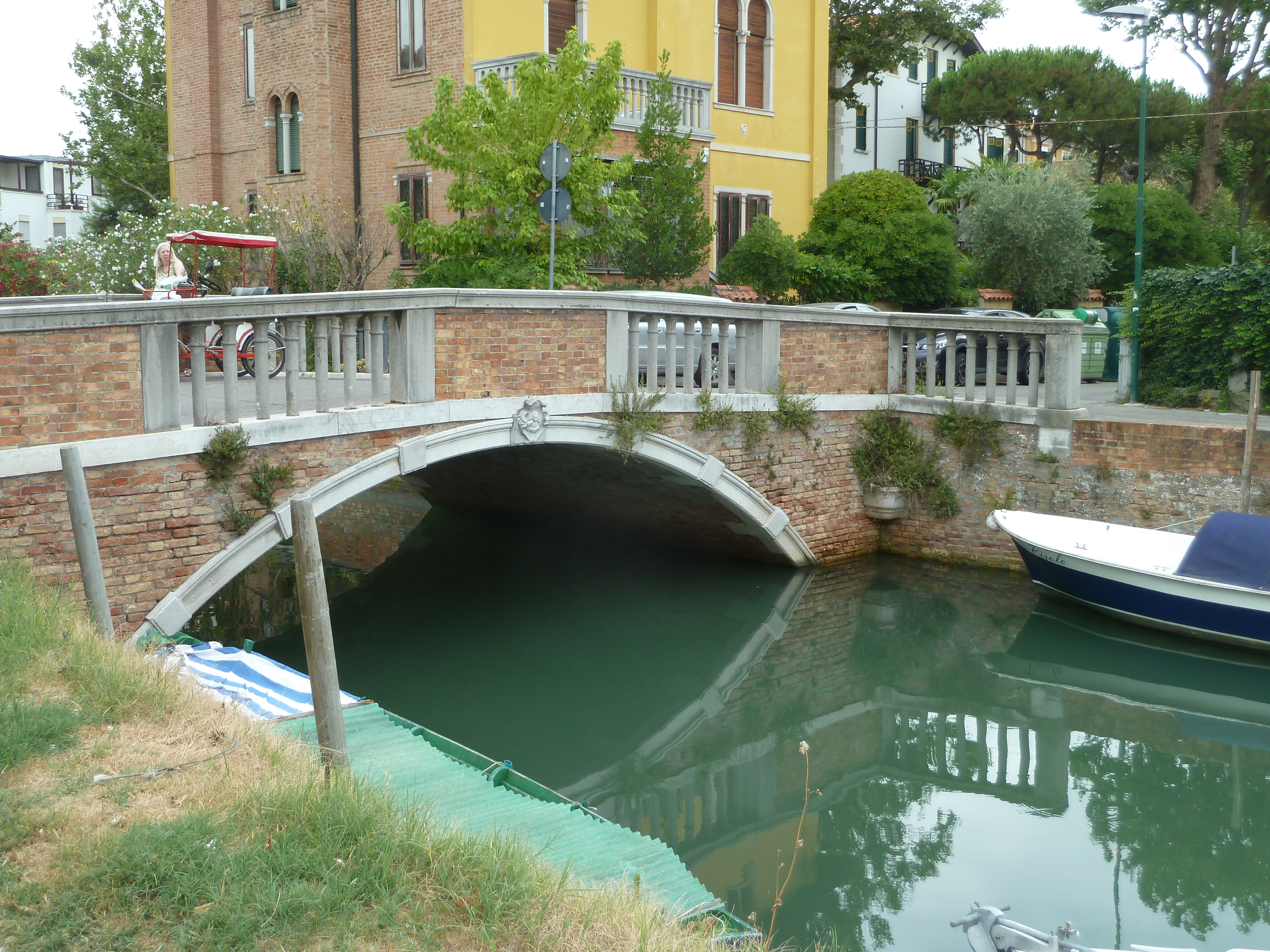
Pont via Lorenzo Marcello

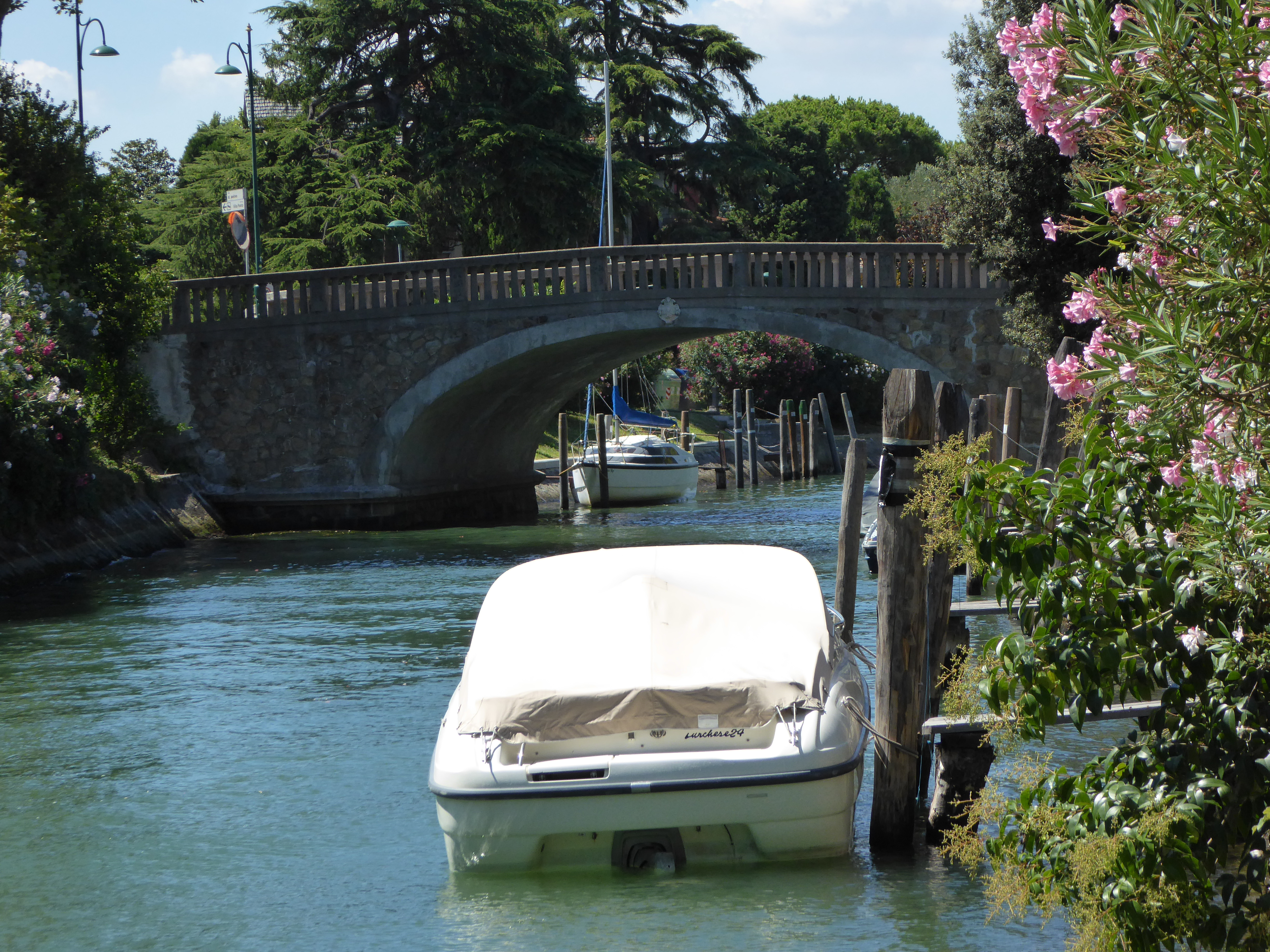
Pont sur le rio menant au Casino

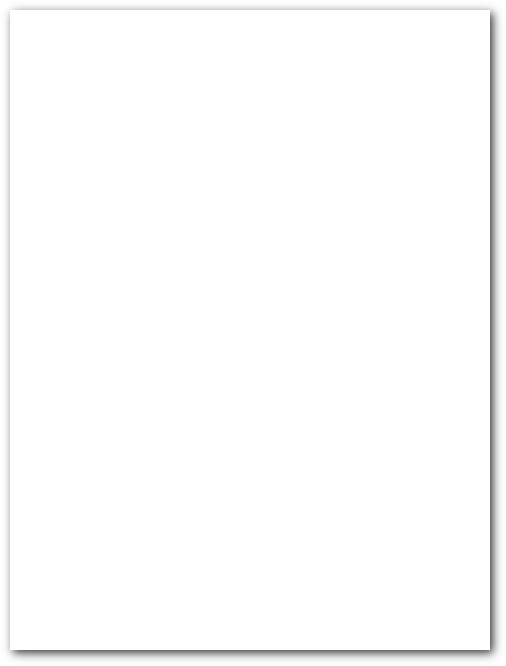
Pont via delle Quattro Fontane

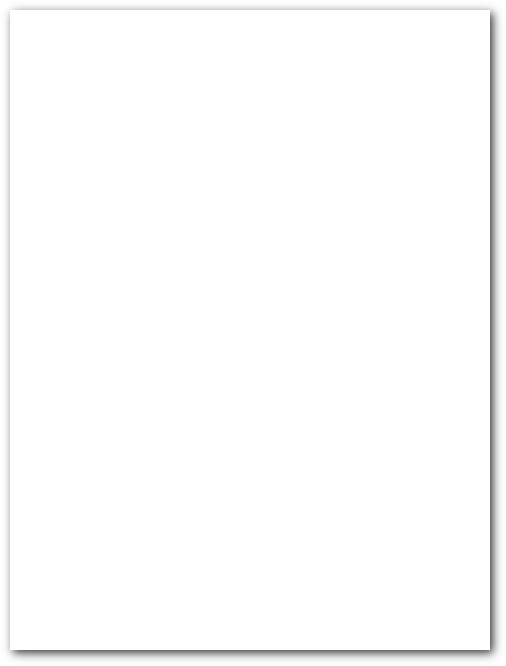
Pont via Candia

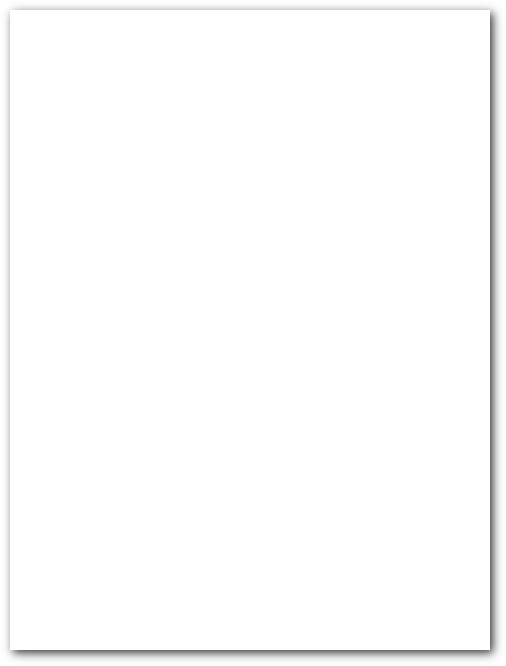
Pont via Francesco Morosini

== Sources ==
- Venise, Guide Vert, Michelin, ISBN 2-06-000035-1
- Venezia, CartoGuides, éd. Lannoo
- Expert Venetie, Tim Jepson, ISBN 90-410-1786-0 OCLC 66195199
- Bridges of Venice, Walking Tours, James Broos, Lulu.com, 2008 - 150 p., ISBN 978-0-6152-1958-5
- Venezia *Ponte per *Ponte "--vita, morte e miracoli-- " dei 443 manufatti che attraversano i canali della città, Gianpietro Zucchetta, 1992, Stamperia di Venezia, Venise.
- site reprenant les ponts de Venise
- liste de ponts avec caractéristiques

== See also ==
- List of bridges in Italy
- List of bridges in Rome
