= Ponte dei Bareteri =

Coordinates: 45.4361°N 12.3377°E

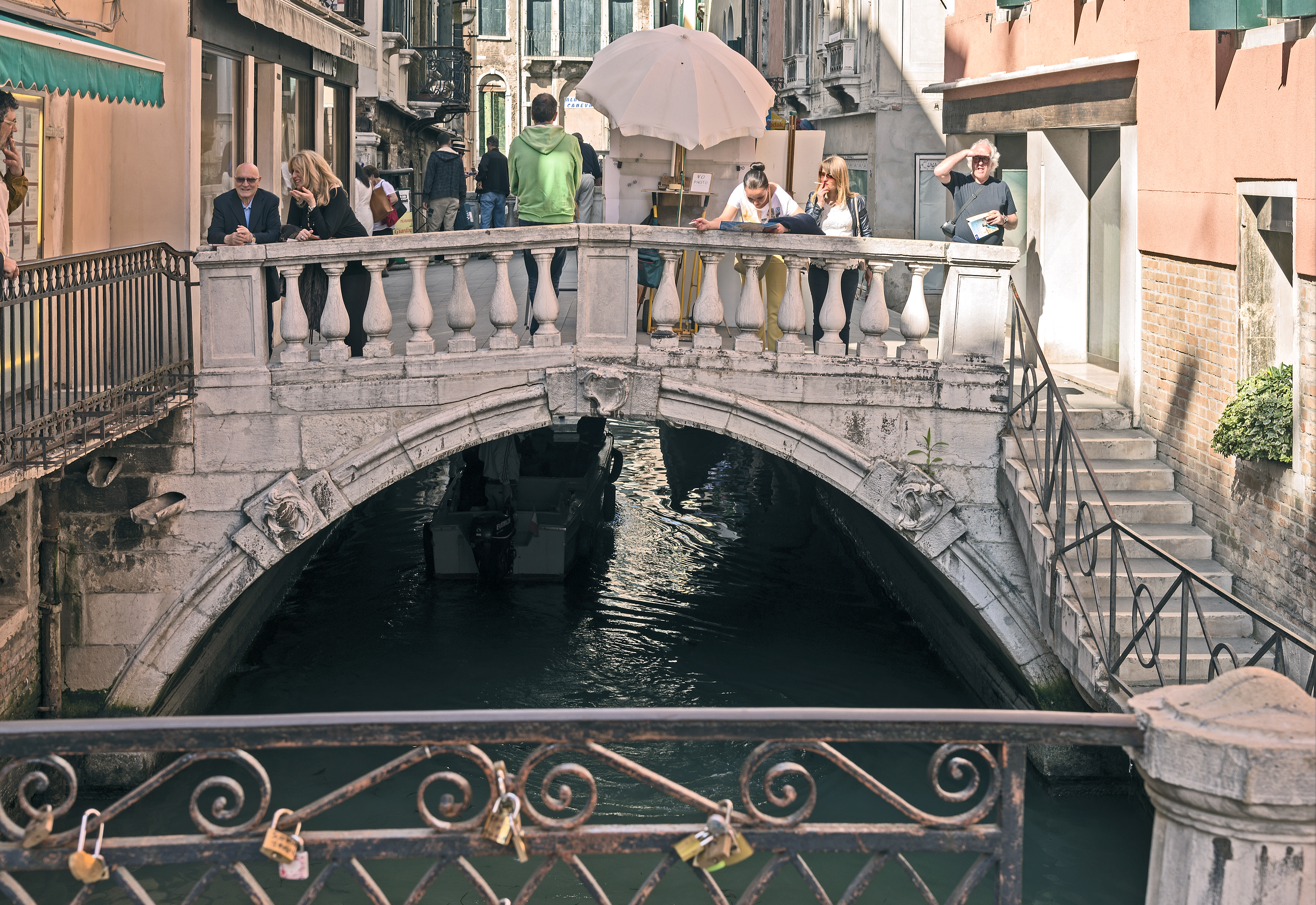
Ponte dei Bareteri

Ponte dei Bareteri is a bridge in Venice, Italy. It is named after manufacturers of caps (barète in Venetian dialect) which were common in the area.

The original bridge was wood, replaced by stone in 1508. Both balustrades were restored between 2006 and 2007.
